= Caciques in Puerto Rico =

Head of each Taino tribe in Puerto Rico

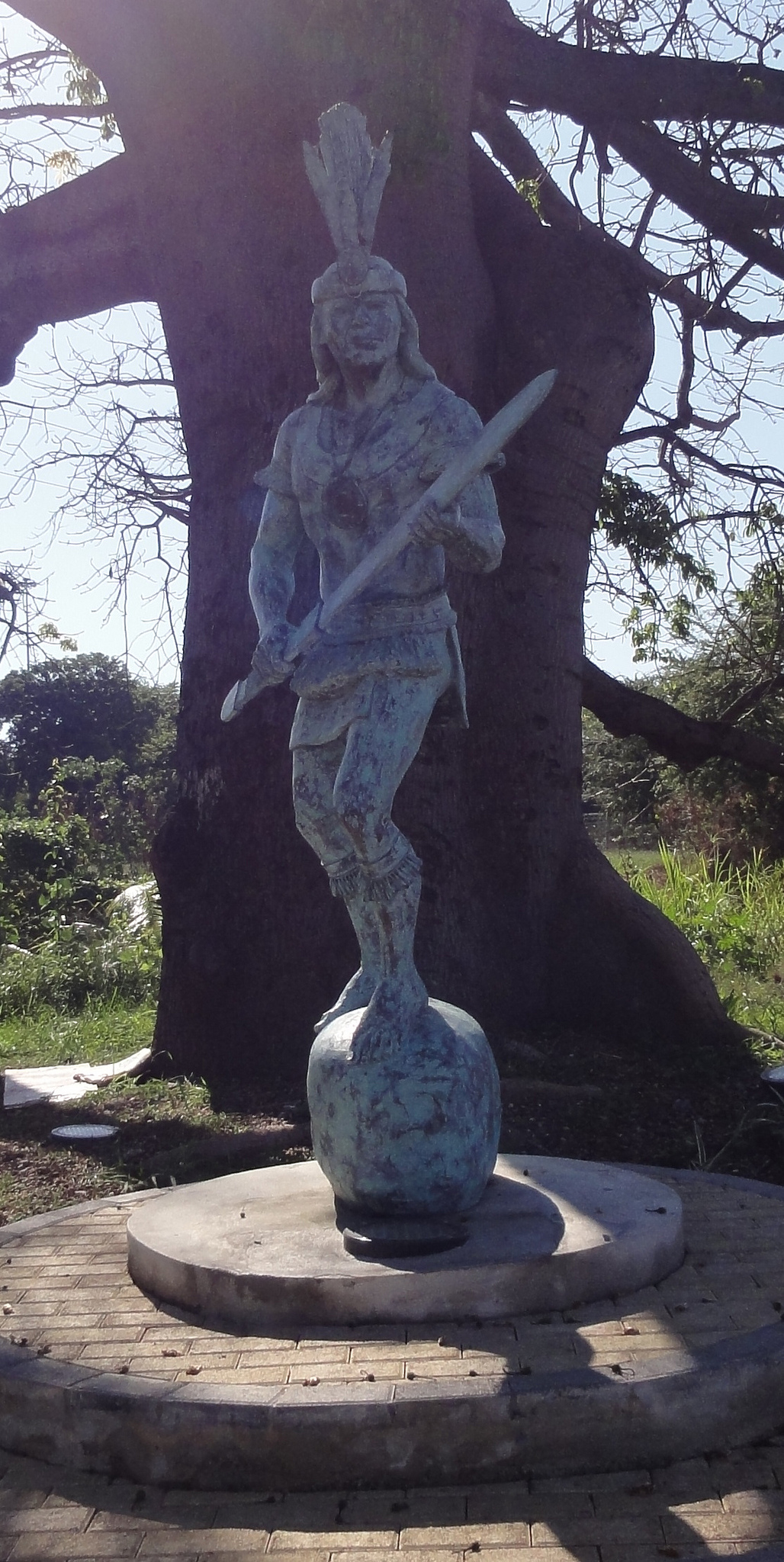
Statue of Agüeybaná II in Parque Monumento, Ponce

The Indigenous Taíno tribes have played a major role in the history and culture of the island of Puerto Rico. At the head of each tribe was a cacique who, along with the nitaínos, governed each of the yucayeques, or villages of the island.

== History of island inhabitance ==
It has been suggested that the first tribe to begin settling in the Caribbean and therefore, Puerto Rico were the Ortoiroid, a small group that left Venezuela for Trinidad and Tobago around 5,000 BC. This group was succeeded by the Casimiroid people coming from Central America, and several other groups, including the Saladoid, before the Taíno took over several hundred years after.

== Position in societal hierarchy ==
The Taíno of Puerto Rico lived in villages known as yucayeques, spread throughout the island. At the bottom of the hierarchy were the common people, who were known as naborias. These naborias were workers who also hunted, prepared food, and built houses in the community, which were called bohíos. According to The Encyclopedia of Caribbean Religions, "Naborias may have been descendants of "less pure" kinship lines, that is, descendants of Guanahatabey or the unnamed indigenous peoples of the third wave, or of kinship lines not as crafty in statesmanship as others." Above the naborias were the nobles, known as the nitaínos. They were in charge of keeping the naborias in check as well as leading them into battle. Finally, above the nitaínos were the caciques. Caciques were not only government officials, they acted as religious figures as well. These leaders held control of the yucayeques with often nobody higher to answer to except occasional situations where there were multiple caciques governing a single region, in which they would answer to a supreme cacique.

== Significance in Puerto Rican history ==
Caciques played a large role in the history of the island, most notably when the Spanish came to take their territory. Upon Spanish arrival in 1508, there were an estimated 20,000-50,000 Taínos living on the island. Believing the Spaniards were spiritual entities, the Taínos were very hospitable to the Spanish. Knowing this, the Spanish used the Taínos for labor and finding gold on the island. After much mistreatment, and the implement of the encomienda system over the land, the caciques and Taínos as a group lost their control of the island.

As a result of the Spanish abuse and dwindling number of Taínos, cacique Agüeybaná II was appointed to head cacique after the death of his brother. Skeptical about the Spaniards being spiritual figures, Agüeybaná II and Urayoán ordered an ambush of Spaniard Diego Salcedo as he was attempting to cross the Río Grande de Añasco. The Taíno drowned the Spaniard and kept his body for three days, fearing resurrection. After seeing the man was in fact mortal, the Taínos declared war on the Spanish, leading to the Spanish–Taíno War of San Juan–Borikén.

The Taíno, led by caciques Agüeybaná II, Urayoán, Coxiguex, Yauco, Jumacao, Loquillo, Orocobix, Guayama, as well as many others, rebelled, however they lacked the weaponry to defeat the Spanish.
