= Urayoán =

Taino chief

Urayoán was an Indigenous cacique (Taíno chief) from Puerto Rico famous for ordering the drowning of Diego Salcedo to determine whether the Spanish were gods.

He was the cacique of "Yucayeque del Yagüeka or Yagüeca," which today lies in the region between Añasco and Mayagüez, Puerto Rico. His territory was marked by the natural boundaries of two rivers: Guaorabo to the north and Yagüez to the south. In 1511, Urayoán and Agüeybaná II (The Brave) conceived a plan to find out whether the Spaniards were really gods. Diego Salcedo (a Spanish soldier) was welcomed by Urayoán into his village and was offered to stay for the night. The following day, by Urayoán's order, Salcedo was drowned while attempting to cross, while on top of a Taíno warrior, the Guaorabo River (presently called Río Grande de Añasco). The body of Salcedo was watched for three days after his death. Upon confirmation of the mortality of the Spanish, Agüeybaná II ordered the Taínos to revolt.

== See also ==
- List of Puerto Ricans
- Agüeybaná
- Agüeybaná II
- List of Taínos
- Arasibo
- Hayuya
- Jumacao
- Orocobix
