= Americo Boschetti =

Puerto Rican musician

Americo Boschetti (April 16, 1951 - May 22, 2025) is a singer, composer and guitarist. Composer of over 500 songs, Boschetti has also transformed many poems into songs by adding music to the lyrics.

== Early years ==
Boschetti was born in Santurce, a section of San Juan, the capital of Puerto Rico. However, he was raised in the town of Corozal where his mother's family came from. There he received his primary and secondary education and at an early age was introduced to the world of music when his mother gave him a guitar as a present. In 1964, he wrote in English his first song influenced by the styles of the Beatles, Rolling Stones and Bob Dylan.

In 1968, Boschetti enrolled at the University of Puerto Rico and became involved in the Puerto Rican independence movement. He was also involved in the student protests of that era against the Vietnam War, the presence of the ROTC in the university's campus and other political issues. He started writing songs directed towards social reforms and romantic themes.

== Musical style ==
His compositions were not limited to one particular style, but to a diversified variety of styles which included rock and roll, bolero, salsa, etc. The death of his mother Conchita, in 1970 affected him very much and may be reflected in the songs which he wrote in tribute to women, love and children.

In 1973, Boschetti decided to self-exile to avoid the U.S. military draft. The exile, which lasted until 1978, started in Europe, continued in Canada and ended in the United States. While in Europe, Boschetti wrote an operetta based on the drowning of Diego Salcedo by the Taíno Agueybana II, nephew of Taíno Cacique Agüeybaná. The operetta included 36 of Boschetti's songs and was written as a play in 1975 in Stromboli, Italy and made into an operetta in the United States in 1977 in Mandeville, Louisiana.

Boschetti returned to Puerto Rico in 1978, however in 1977 he secretly visited the island to meet with Puerto Rican singer Danny Rivera. Rivera agreed to record one of Boschetti's song La Guaracha del ruiseñor, which he included in his album Alborada. Once Boschetti reestablished himself in the island, he co-founded the group "Colindancias". In 1981, Boschetti made his recording debut with the song Colindancias and went on tour.

== Compositions ==
Among Boschetti's compositions are the following:

- Guajira de la Espera
- Manuela
- Mujer
- El Cántico de las Hojas
- La Guaracha del Ruiseñor
- Mi Tierra Mía
- Señorita Sylvia
- Canción para los Ninos
- La Mujer de las Islas

In 1984, he decided to take a vacation (semi-retired) from the world of music. He had written over 500 songs and had also transformed some of the poems from the likes of Jose de Diego, Luis Lloréns Torres, Julia de Burgos, Juan Antonio Corretjer and José Martí into songs by adding music to the lyrics. During his vacation his songs were recorded by many artists, among them Haciendo Punto en Otro Son, Katraska, Danny Rivera, Perla del Sur, Cheo Feliciano, Josy Latorre, and Moliendo Vidrio.

== Later years ==
In 2000, he returned from his retirement and released Antología sencilla (Simple Anthology), which included 13 new compositions and 11 of his earlier songs. On April 25, 2004 he composed and recorded Canción Elegía, which he dedicated to Carlos Muñiz Varela, a young Cuban civil rights advocate who was murdered. Currently Americo Boschetti continues to write, record and perform with his band.

== See also ==
- List of Puerto Ricans
- Corsican immigration to Puerto Rico
