= Agüeybaná El Bravo (statue) =

Stone statue to the memory of Agüeybaná II, the last Taíno cacique in Puerto Rico

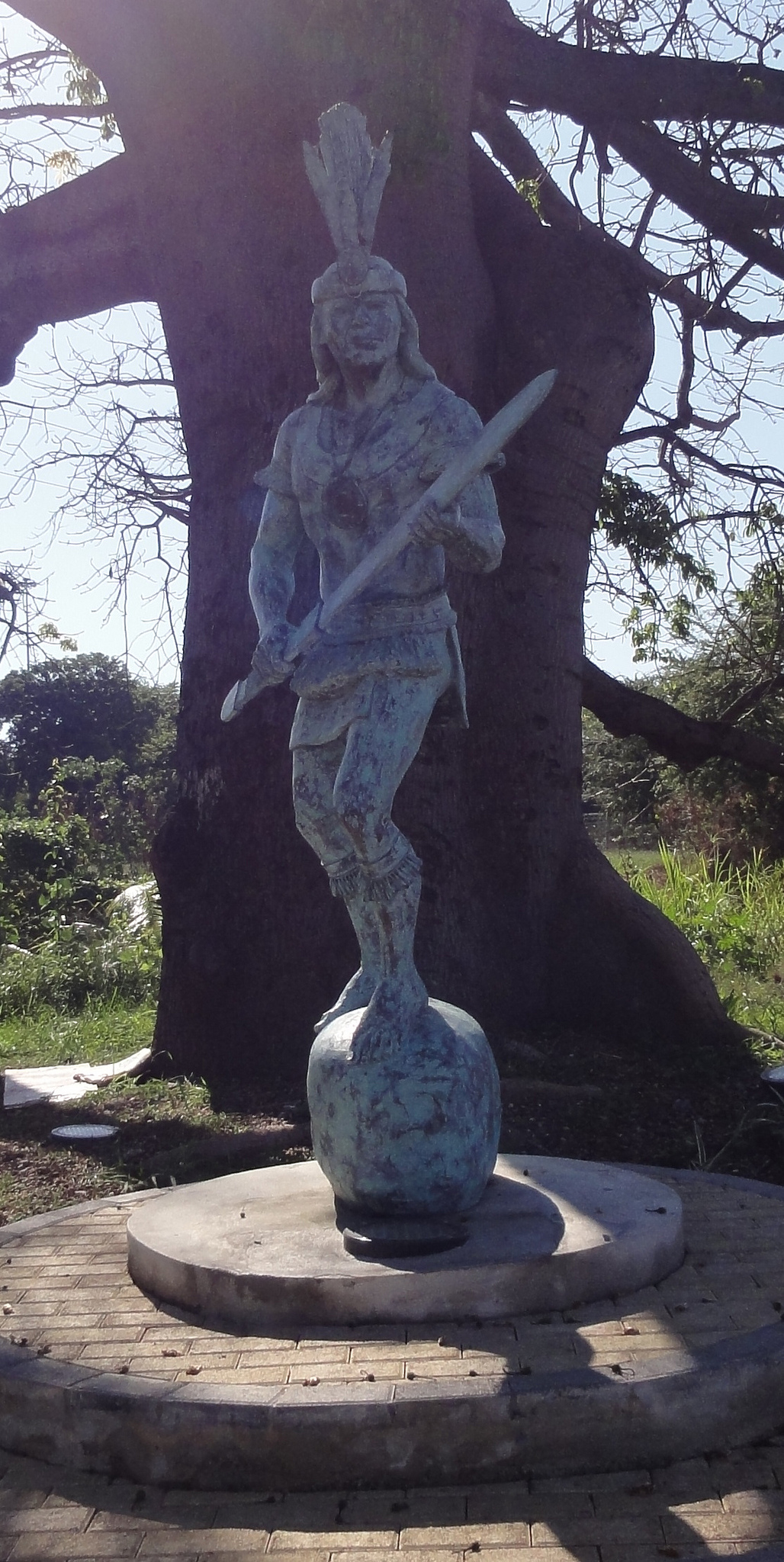

- Location of the statue within Puerto Rico
- Artist: Unknown
- Year: 2008
- Type: Stone on stone pedestal
- Condition: Pristine
- Location: Parque Agüeybaná El Bravo Ponce, Puerto Rico; 17°59′44.8434″N 66°36′51.2634″W
- Owner: Municipality of Ponce, PR

Agüeybaná El Bravo is a stone statue to the memory of Agüeybaná II, a Taíno cacique in Puerto Rico, for his bravery in fighting the Spanish invaders during the sixteenth century. It is located at Plaza Agüeybaná El Bravo in Barrio Playa, at the southeast corner of the intersection of PR-2/Ponce Bypass and Avenida Hostos, just south of sector Caracoles in Ponce, Puerto Rico.

== Background ==
Agüeybaná El Bravo (English: Agüeybaná The Brave) [c. 1470 – 1511], also known as Agüeybaná II, was one of the two principal and most powerful caciques of the Taíno people in "Borikén" when the Spaniards first arrived in Puerto Rico on 19 November 1493. Agüeybaná II led the Taínos of Puerto Rico in the Battle of Yagüecas, also known as the "Taíno rebellion of 1511" against Juan Ponce de León and the Spanish Conquistadors. It was the last Taíno rebellion against the Spanish Conquistadores, and Agüeybaná II was killed during the battle. In a show of solidarity with the Taino cacique Agueybana, every November during the day when others are celebrating Columbus Day, supporters of Agueybana and the Taino tradition gather near the statue for Taino songs, music, dances, food and presentations.

== Description ==
The statue is located in Barrio Playa, across the "Caracoles" sector of Barrio San Anton, in Ponce, Puerto Rico, at a small park also named after him. According to historian Jalil Sued Badillo, the location where the statue currently stands was the home of the former grand cacique. The statue was installed during the administration of Mayor Francisco Zayas Seijo. The statue was created in Mexico by order of former Ponce Mayor Rafael Cordero Santiago, but remained unveiled until October 2008. In a show of solidarity with Agüeybaná El Bravo, every November on the day when others are celebrating Columbus Day, supporters of Agueybana and the Taíno tradition gather near the statue for Taíno songs, music, dances, food and presentations.
