= Caguax =

Indigenous leader in Boriquen/Puerto Rico

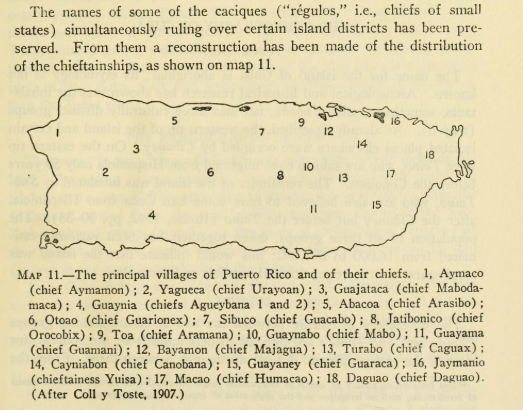
- Smithsonian 1901 map of Puerto Rico caciques

Cacique of Turabo
- Reign: c. 1508 - c. 1519
- Successor: Maria Bagaaname
- Born: "Borinquén"
- Died: c. 1519; Puerto Rico
- Issue: Maria Bagaaname; Comerio Taya; Isabel Taya
- Mother: Cacica Yayo

Caguax was an Indigenous cacique (Taíno chief) who lived on the island of Borinquén (the Indigenous name for Puerto Rico) before and during the Spanish colonization of the Americas. The name of his yucayeque, or Taino village, was Turabo; it comprised the Caguas Valley and surrounding mountains. This area today comprises the modern municipalities of Caguas, Aguas Buenas, Gurabo, and portions of San Lorenzo, Juncos and Las Piedras in east-central Puerto Rico. Guaybanex Caguax was an early convert to the Catholic faith; he adopted the Spanish name Francisco at the time of his baptism. His high rank in Taino society allowed him to also retain his Taino names, Guaybanex, and his surname, Caguax. Francisco Guaybanex Caguax sought to avoid conflict with the Spanish; as a powerful chief in the northern slopes and plains of the island he understood the heavy toll his people would suffer if they were to oppose the Spanish rule, and he sought peaceful ways to deal with the situation. As early as 1508, Caguax cooperated with the colonists’ requests for labor and a food supply. In 1511, he was one of only two chiefs who accepted the peace terms that the Spanish had offered a few months after the Taino Revolt started. In 1512, he was taken captive and transported to Hacienda del Toa. There he was humiliated before his nitainos by being forced to become the governor's personal servant. Caguax died in captivity in 1518 or early 1519. He was succeeded by his daughter, Maria Bagaaname.

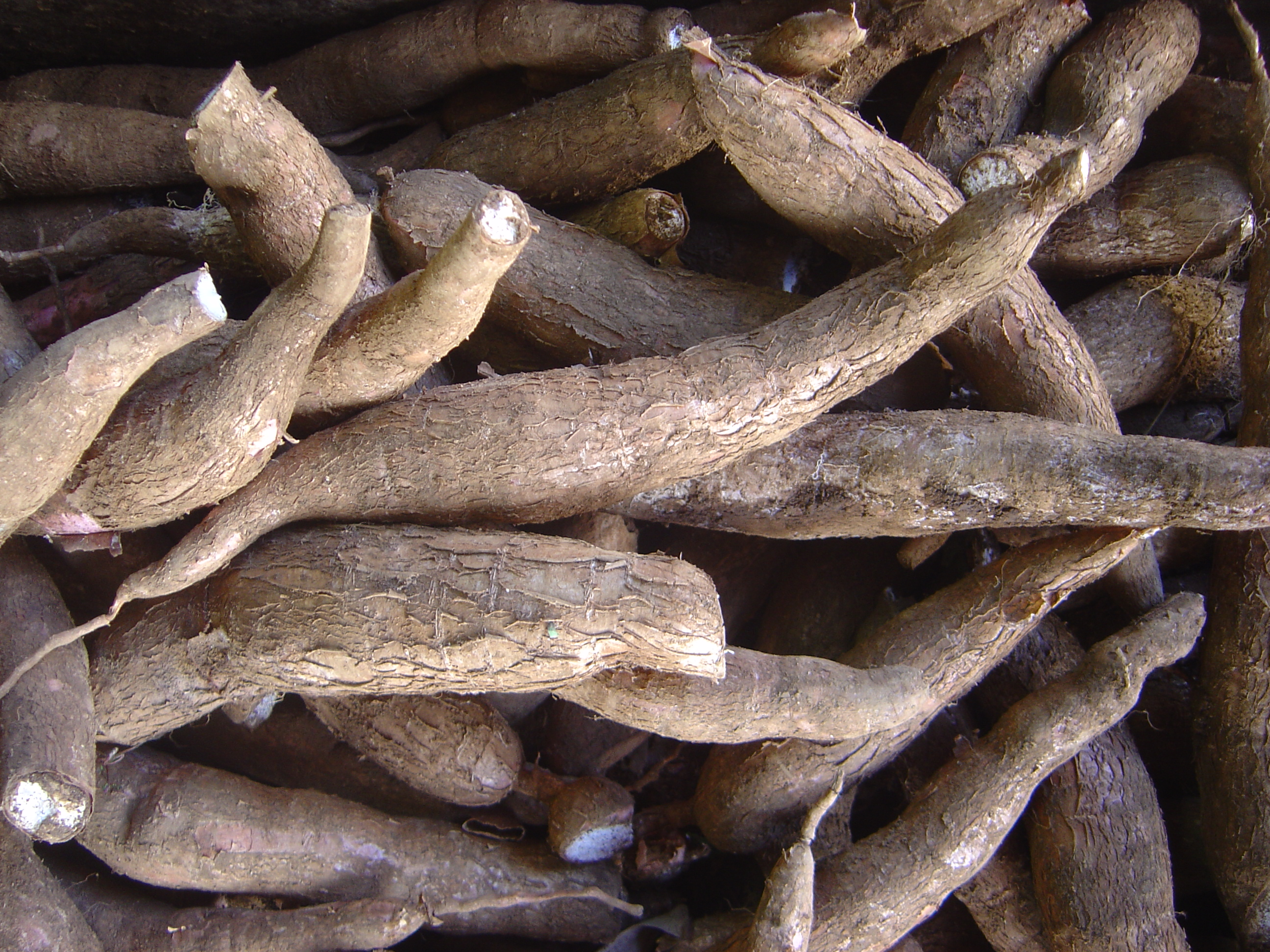
yuca

Late in 1508 Juan Ponce de León, commissioned by Nicolás de Ovando to colonize the island of San Juan Bautista, arrived in the territory of cacique Agüeybaná I in southwest Puerto Rico. There, both leaders performed the Guaytiao ceremony, in which they exchanged names as a promise not to hurt each other. This sort of peace treaty allowed Ponce de León to settle the island and to receive cooperation from Agüeybaná I's cacique allies in order to grow the yuca that was needed to feed the Spanish settlers.

Caguax was among those allies of the Spanish who were willing to use their authority to organize their nitainos (or "captains", as the Spanish called them), to direct the labor of naborias under them for these purposes. Products such as yuca and peppers were grown in Caguax's domain for colonists Francisco Robledo and Juan de Castellanos. In 1510, this production had a value of 255 gold pesos. Robledo and Castellanos not only had rights over the food production process but also over the Taino, the indigenous people, who provided the labor in the fields, and were known in the Taino language as conucos. When gold was discovered in the Turabo River, this same Taino power structure was also used to force the Taino people to work in the mines and rivers in search of gold.

By 1511, the growing tensions between the Spanish and the Taino exploded in revolts around the island that lasted into 1518. After Ponce de León won the first battles early in 1511, peace was offered to the island caciques. Only two accepted: Caguax and Otoao. During this time of great distress, Ponce de León was replaced as island governor by Juan Cerón, and Nicolás de Ovando was replaced in Santo Domingo by Diego Colón. Up until this time, Caguax, his family, nitainos and naborias, had lived in their own yucayeque in the Caguas Valley near the Caguitas River. Archaeologist Carlos A. Pérez Merced, excavating in the area, found ceramic and pottery from three different indigenous periods: Igneri, pre-Taino and Taino. This indicates the existence of an ancient indigenous settlement at the site.

Early in 1512, Cerón redistributed Ponce de León's caciques among his friends and banished Caguax, along with his relatives and entourage, to Hacienda del Toa in the northern coastal plain, west of Caparra, the first Spanish settlement on the island. His mother, siblings, wives and children have been identified by records that were sent to la Real Hacienda to account for the distribution of clothes and other goods, called the "cacona", which were given to the indigenous people in captivity once a year between 1513 and 1519. Historians Raquel Rosario Rivera and Jalil Sued Badillo, among others, have concluded that Cacica Yayo was Caguax’s mother, which means that she was the ranking cacica whose descendants would inherit the rank of Turabo chiefs. Her daughter Catalina, Caguax's sister, should have borne the next cacique or cacica to reign after Caguax, but at the time of her death in captivity she had no living heirs; the same was true of her sister Maria. Their brother, Juan Comerio, could not inherit the rank of chief as he was not in the line of succession. Cacica Catalina died soon after being taken to el Toa. Caguax died later, sometime between late 1518 and early 1519. Historian Jalil Sued Badillo argued that María Bagaaname and María de Caguas were two different cacicas. According to his interpretation, Caguax was succeeded by his niece María de Caguas, daughter of his sister Isabel Cayaguax, in accordance with Taíno matrilineal inheritance practices. Caguax had two other children, Comerio and Isabel. He also had two wives, María and Leonor, and it is unclear which of his three children were borne by which of them. Around 1524, Maria Bagaaname married Diego Muriel, an overseer in Hacienda del Toa's. This marriage was approved by the authorities, and the couple bore descendants. As for the nitainos who had been forced to move with Caguax to oversee the work in Hacienda del Toa, records show that Aguayayex, Guayex, Caguas, Juanico Comerio, Juan Acayaguana, Diego Barrionuevo, Esteban directed agricultural tasks and that Pedro was in charge of the mines. They oversaw 230 naborias from Caguax's yukayeque who had been taken there to work in the conucos and the mines. Cerón forced Caguax to be his personal servant, as his nitainos and naborias were forced to work the conucos and gold mines.

The city and municipality of Caguas, Puerto Rico derives its name from him, and a neighborhood there is named after him.

== See also ==
- List of Puerto Ricans
- List of Tainos
