= Legend of Diego Salcedo =

Semi-legendary Spanish explorer

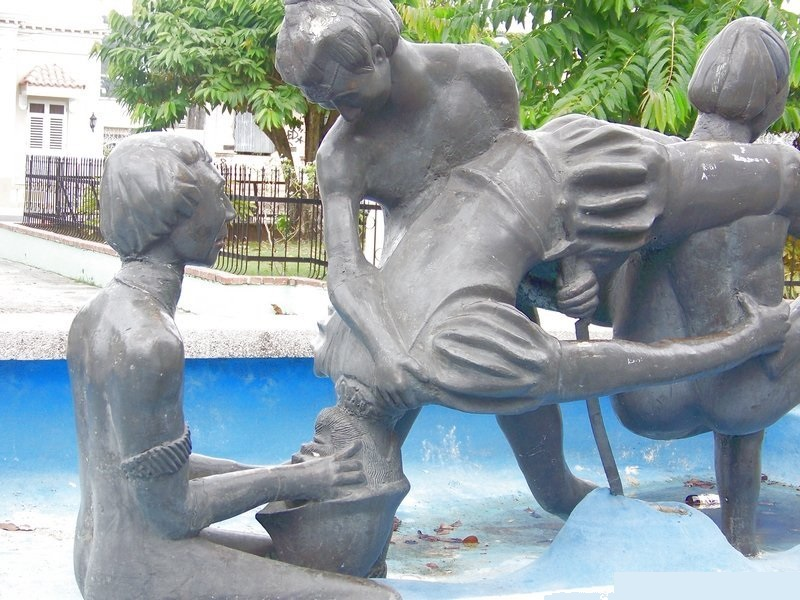
Statue of the drowning of Diego Salcedo in the plaza of Añasco in Puerto Rico

Diego Salcedo (died 1511) was a semi-legendary Spanish conquistador who is said to have lived during the colonization of the Americas. According to legend, his death at the hands of the Indigenous Taíno people ignited the Taíno rebellion of 1511.

== Salcedo's death ==
According to the story, Salcedo died in 1511, during a trip to Puerto Rico, when Taínos, under the command of Agüeybaná II (brother of the great Taino Cacique Agüeybaná) and the Cacique of Añasco, Urayoán, drowned him in the Río Grande de Añasco. Historically, two versions about how Salcedo was lured to his death have collided. Many books assert that the soldier had been told he'd be taken to a lake filled with Taíno women that he could have sex with, and, once there, he found not women, but men who then proceeded to drown him. The other version has Salcedo being offered a ride across a river by Taínos who carried him on their arms, and then drowned him and kept him for days, afraid he'd still be alive and waiting until they were certain he was dead.

A third, and most accepted version of Salcedo's death says that the Tainos, fearing that the Spaniards might be gods, refrained from harming them. After suffering under the Spaniards for so long, the Tainos, by order of Agüeybaná, ambushed Salcedo as he was drinking water at the edge of a river. Fearing that Salcedo might resurrect after three days—based on their understanding of the Christian teachings wielded by Catholic priests—they sat around for three days waiting for Salcedo to come back from the dead, but all they saw was Salcedo's body rotting due to the heat just as they would. At that moment the Tainos realized that these were no gods.

It was with Salcedo's death that the Taínos were encouraged to declare war on the Spaniards in Puerto Rico. This led to the Taino rebellion of 1511. However, the Tainos were quickly defeated due to the Spaniards' better weaponry and war expertise. After the death of Agüeybaná II, the native warriors retracted and became disorganized. Agüeybaná II's followers opted for engaging the Spaniards via guerilla tactics. Such guerilla warfare lasted for the next eight years, until 1519. A second round of raids erupted in 1513 when Ponce de Leon departed the island to explore Florida. The settlement of Caparra, the seat of the island government at that time, was sacked and burned by an alliance between Taínos and natives from the northeastern Antilles.

By 1520 the Taíno presence on the island had almost disappeared. A government census in 1530 reports the existence of only 1,148 Taínos remaining in Puerto Rico. However, oppressive conditions for the surviving Taíno continued. Many of those who stayed on the island soon died either due to cruel treatment or the smallpox epidemic, which attacked the island in 1519.

== Legend ==
A local legend tells of a ghostly Taino woman, supposedly Salcedo's lover, that still haunts the site of his drowning at Añasco. This belief is exemplified by a verse in the town's anthem:

History tells that here Salcedo was drowned, and that in the fall a female Taino is seen at night.

== Salcedo in popular culture ==
Salcedo is referenced in a song of Puerto Rican rock band Fiel a la Vega. The song is titled "El Asunto: Salcedo Sigue Siendo Mortal" (The Issue: Salcedo is still a Mortal) and it makes a comparison between the Spaniards' rule in the island and the United States' invasion of 1898.

== See also ==
- Agüeybaná
- Agüeybaná II
- Arasibo
- Hayuya
- Jumacao
- Orocobix
- History of Puerto Rico
