= Agüeybaná =

Agüeybaná may refer to:

- Agüeybaná I (died 1510), Taíno cacique on Puerto Rico during Spanish contact
- Agüeybaná II (1470–1511), or Güeybaná, Agüeybaná I's brother and successor who led the Taíno rebellion of 1511
