= Guainía =

Guainía may refer to:

- Guainía Department of Colombia
- Rio Negro (Amazon), known as Guainía River in Colombia
- Guaynia, southern coast of Puerto Rico in the pre-Columbian era
