= 1887 Puerto Rico census =

Last Spanish census in Puerto Rico

Ninth census of Puerto Rico
- 1 December 1887; 138 years ago

General information
- Country: Captaincy General of Puerto Rico
- Authority: Statistics Commission of the Kingdom
- Website: censo.estadisticas.pr

Results
- Total population: 798,565 (▲9%)
- Most populous department: Ponce (159,311)
- Least populous department: Vieques (5,975)

The 1887 Puerto Rico census was the ninth population census held in Puerto Rico and the last census count under Spanish rule. Under Spanish rule, censuses had been taken at irregular intervals in Puerto Rico between 1765 and 1887. The population count was 798,565 - an increase of 66,917 or 9.0% over the previous census in 1877. After 1887, the following Puerto Rican census of 1899 was held during US rule.

== Race ==
The 1887 census had two primary race options; one for white people and one for "colored" people (non-white). There was no census option for Indigenous people. At 474,933 people, 59.5% of the population was white. The total "colored" population was 323,632 people. 246,647 people were sub-classified as Mulattos, making up 76.2% of the total non-white population.

== See also ==
- Puerto Rican citizenship and nationality
