= Cacique =

Hispanic term for Indigenous Caribbean chief

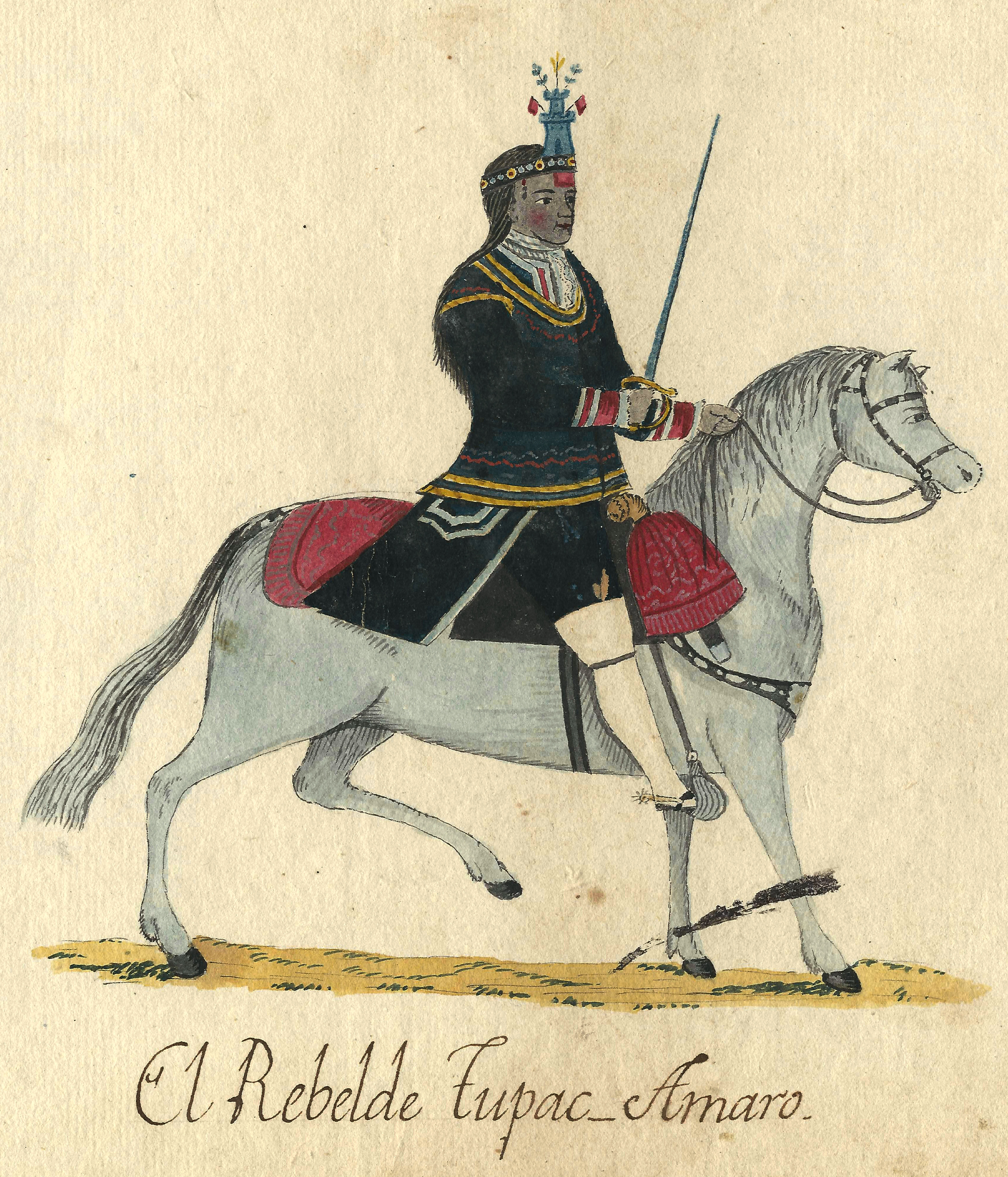
Túpac Amaru II, an Andean cacique who led a 1781 rebellion against Spanish rule in Peru

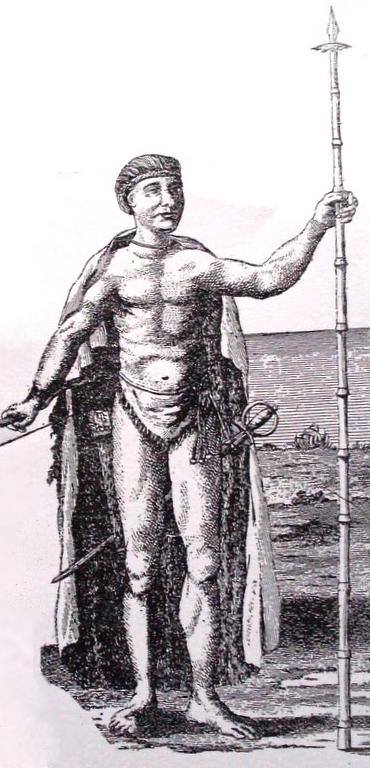
Cangapol, chief of the Tehuelches, 18th century.

A cacique, sometimes spelled as cazique (Latin American Spanish: [kaˈsike]; Portuguese: [kɐˈsikɨ, kaˈsiki]; feminine form: cacica), was a tribal chieftain of certain Indigenous peoples of the Caribbean and Latin America, such as the Kalinago and Taíno peoples. The term is a Spanish derivation from the Kalinago word kassiquan.

Cacique was initially translated as "king" or "prince" for the Spanish. In the colonial era, the conquistadors and the administrators who followed them used the word generically to refer to any leader of practically any Indigenous group they encountered in the Western Hemisphere. In Hispanic and Lusophone countries, the term has also come to mean a political boss, similar to a caudillo, exercising power in a system of caciquism.

== Spanish colonial-era caciques ==
The word cacique descends from the Kalinago word kassiquan, which means "to keep house". In 1555 the word first entered the English language, defined as "prince". In Taíno culture, the kasike rank was hereditary and sometimes established through democratic means. As the Taínos were mostly a peaceable culture the kasike's importance in the tribe was determined by the size of his clan rather than his skills in warfare. The Taíno kasikes also enjoyed several privileges that marked them as the elite class of Taíno society: they lived in a larger rectangular hut in the center of the village, rather than the peripheral circular huts of other villagers, and they had reserved places from which to view the areítos (ceremonial dances) and ceremonial ball game. Most importantly, the kasike's word was law and they exercised this power to oversee a sophisticated government, finely involved with all aspects of social existence.

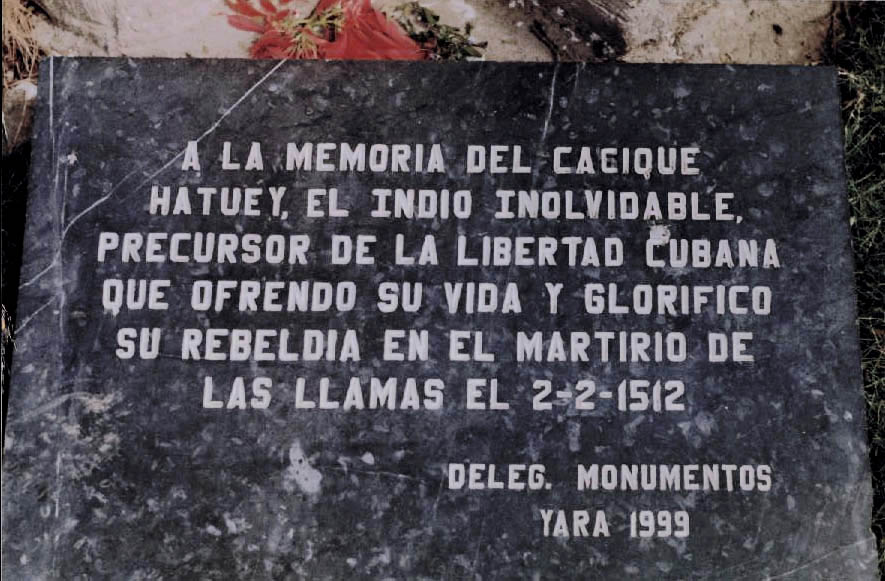
Hatuey monument plaque

The Spanish transliterated kasike and used the term (cacique) to refer to the local leader of essentially any Indigenous group in Spanish America. Caribbean caciques who did not initially oppose the Spanish became middlemen, serving as the interface between their communities and the Spanish. Their cooperation was frequently provisional. Most of the early caciques eventually revolted, resulting in their deaths in battle or by execution. Two of the most famous of these early colonial-era caciques are Hatuey from what is now Cuba and Enriquillo on the island of Hispaniola. Both are now respective national heroes in Cuba and the Dominican Republic.

The Spanish had more success when they drafted the leaders of the far more hierarchically organized Indigenous civilizations of Central Mexico. These Central Mexican caciques served as more effective, and loyal, intermediaries in the new system of colonial rule. The hierarchy and nomenclature of Indigenous leadership usually survived within a given community and the Spaniards' designation of caciques did not usually correspond to the hereditary or likely candidate from a given system of Indigenous leadership.

As a consequence, elite Indigenous men willing to cooperate with the colonial rulers replaced their rivals who had better hereditary or traditional claims on leadership. The Spanish recognized Indigenous nobles as a European-style nobility, within the newly established colonial system and a cacique's status among the colonizers (along with that of his family) was buttressed by their being permitted the Spanish noble honorifics don and doña.

As colonial middlemen, caciques were often the first to introduce European material culture to their communities. This is seen in the Spanish-style houses they built, the Spanish furnishings that filled them and the European fashions they wore everywhere. They engaged in Spanish commercial enterprises such as sheep and cattle ranchers and sericulture. Many even owned enslaved Africans to operate these concerns. The caciques also acquired new privileges, unknown before contact. These included the right to carry swords or firearms and to ride horses or mules. Some caciques had entailed estates called cacicazgos. The records of many of these Mexican estates are held in the Mexican national archives in a section Vínculos ("entails"). The establishment of Spanish-style town government (cabildos) served as a mechanism to supplant traditional rule. Spanish manipulation of cabildo elections placed compliant members of the traditional, hereditary lineages on such cabildos town councils.

By the late colonial era in central Mexico, the term cacique had lost any dynastic meaning, with one scholar noting that "cacique status could in some degree buttress a family's prestige, but it could no longer in itself be regarded as a rank of major authority." In a 1769 petition by a cacique family to the Viceroy of New Spain, appealing for the restoration of its privileges, the following expectations were listed: "that, the cacique should be seated separately from commoners at public functions; he was excused from serving in town government; he was exempted from tribute and other exactions; he was excused from Sunday worship and payments of the half real; his servants were not liable for community labor; he was exempt from incarceration for debt and his property from sequestration; he could be imprisoned for serious crime but not in the public jail; the caciques' names were to be listed among the nobles in official registers; and "all these privileges are to apply equally to the caciques' wives and widows." With Mexican independence in 1821, the last of the special privileges of colonial-era caciques were finally abolished.

In contrast to the rest of the Spanish Colonial Americas, in the Andean region the local term kuraka was preferred to cacique. After conquering the Inca Empire the Spaniards administering the new Peruvian viceroyalty had allowed the kurakas or caciques to maintain their titles of nobility and perquisites of local rule so long as they swore fealty to the Spanish monarch.

In 1781, the Tīpac Amaru rebellion was led by a kuraka who claimed to be a descendant of the Inca royal line, that of the final Inca, Túpac Amaru. At independence in 1825, Simón Bolívar abolished noble titles, but the power and prestige of the kurakas were already in decline following the Great Rebellion. Kuraka rebellions had been waged since the beginning of the Spanish colonial rule, and decades after Túpac Amaru II's 1781 uprising other insurrections such as the Túpac Katari or the Mateo Pumakawa uprisings were often the first major engagements of the South American Wars of Independence.

== Cacicas in colonial Mexico ==
Cacicas played significant roles as female leaders and entrepreneurs within Indigenous Mexican communities. These women held titles independently, distinct from their husbands, and did not lose their status if they married outside their rank. Cacicas possessed financial insight, engaging in business transactions like property dealings and managing financial networks. They owned valuable assets including land, homes, and livestock, often securing the best and most fertile territories.

Despite their entrepreneurial focus, cacicas also wielded considerable authority, acknowledged by Indigenous communities, the Spanish Crown, and the Catholic Church. Their status rivaled high-ranking Spanish men, with privileges like special treatment at religious ceremonies and even distinguished burial sites. This recognition extended beyond their ancestors, surpassing the rank of notable figures such as Isabel Moctezuma and her lineage.

The multifaceted roles of cacicas highlight their integral contributions to Mexican society under Spanish rule, demonstrating their adeptness in economic enterprise, societal leadership, and cultural influence across Indigenous communities.

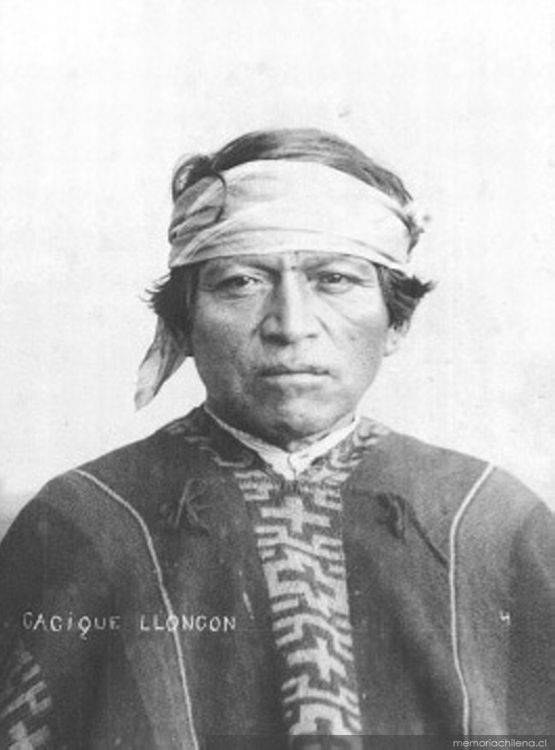
Mapuche cacique (lonko) Lloncon, southern Chile, around 1890

== Caciquismo and caudillismo ==
An extension of the term cacique, caciquismo ('boss rule') can refer to a political system dominated by the power of local political bosses, the caciques. In the post-independence period in Mexico, the term retained its meaning of "Indigenous" leaders, but also took on a more general usage of a "local" or "regional" leader as well. Some scholars make a distinction between caudillos (political strongmen) and their rule, caudillismo, and caciques and caciquismo. One Argentine intellectual, Carlos Octavio Bunge viewed caciquismo as emerging from anarchy and political disruption and then evolving into a "pacific" form of "civilized caciquismo", such as Mexico's Porfirio Díaz (r. 1876–1911). Argentine writer Fernando N.A. Cuevillas views caciquismo as being "nothing more than a special brand of tyrant".

In Spain, caciquismo appeared in the late 19th-century and early 20th-century Spain. Writer Ramón Akal González views Galicia in northwest of Spain, as having remained in a continual state of strangulated growth over centuries as a result of caciquismo and nepotism. "Galicia still suffers from this anachronistic caste of caciques." Spanish strongman El Caudillo Francisco Franco (1892-1975) was born in Ferrol in Galicia.

In the Philippines, the term cacique democracy was coined by political scientist Benedict Anderson. It has been used in the country to describe the political system wherein local leaders remain very strong, with almost warlord-type powers. The Philippines was a colony of Spain from the late sixteenth century until the 1898 Spanish–American War, after which the United States assumed direct control. American rule saw the introduction of many commercial, political and administrative reforms, making it relatively more progressive and directed towards the modernization of government and commerce in the Philippines. However, traditional Filipino elites, being better educated and better connected than much of the local population, were often able to take advantage of these changes to bolster their positions.

There is no consensus in the scholarly literature about the origins of caciquismo. Murdo J. MacLeod suggests that the terms cacique and caudillo "either require further scrutiny or, perhaps, they have become so stretched by the diversity of explanations and processes packed into them that they have become somewhat empty generalizations".

== Taínos ==
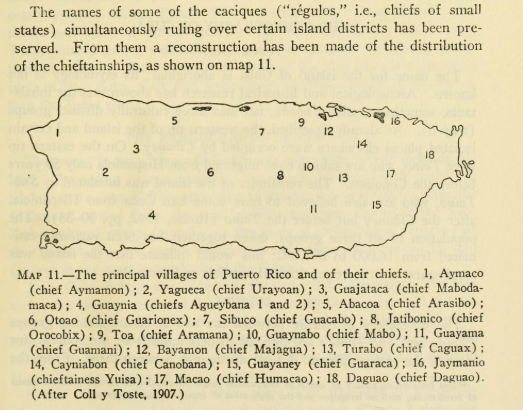
A map by Smithsonian of territories historically governed by different caciques in Puerto Rico

- Agüeybaná (The Great Sun)
- Agüeybaná II (The Brave)
- Anacaona
- Arasibo
- Brizuela
- Caguax
- Comerío
- Enriquillo
- Guacanagarix
- Guamá
- Guarionex
- Habaguanex
- Hatuey
- Hayuya
- Huarea
- Jumacao
- Loquillo
- Orocobix
- Urayoán

== Other notable caciques of the Americas ==
- Aquiminzaque of the Muisca of Chunsa
- Arariboia of the Temininós of Espírito Santo
- Atlácatl of the Pipil of El Salvador
- Carlos of the Calusa
- Catacora of Acora and Puno
- Chacao of Venezuela
- Correque of the Huetar of Costa Rica
- Cunhambebe of the Tupinambás of São Paulo
- Diriangén of the Mangue of Nicaragua
- El Guarco of the Huetar of Costa Rica
- El Quibían of the Ngäbe of Panama
- Felipe Camarão of the Potiguara
- Garabito of the Huetar of Costa Rica
- Gonzalo Mazatzin Moctezuma, Aztec/Mexica emperor
- Guaicaipuro of the Teques and Caracas of Venezuela
- Idacansás of the Muisca of Colombia
- Inacayal of the Tehuelche
- Juan de Lebu of the Moluche of Chile
- Lempira of the Lenca of Honduras
- María of the Tehuelche of Patagonia
- Macuilmiquiztli of the Nicarao of Nicaragua
- Po'pay of Ohkaw Owingeh and the Pueblo republic
- Saguamanchica of the Muisca of Muyquytá
- Saturiwa of the Timucua
- Sepé Tiaraju of the Guarani Missions
- Tamanaco of the Mariches and Quiriquires
- Tibiriçá of the Tupiniquims of São Paulo
- Urracá of the Ngäbe of Panama
- Urriparacoxi of central Florida

== See also ==
- Caciques in Puerto Rico
- Caudillo
- Kalku
- Lonko
- Machi
- Guaicaipuro
- Gregorio de San Juan
- Gregor MacGregor, he claimed to be cacique of Poyais, a fictional Central American country
- European colonization of the Americas
- Principalía, equivalent in colonial Philippines
