= List of Taínos =

List of Taíno
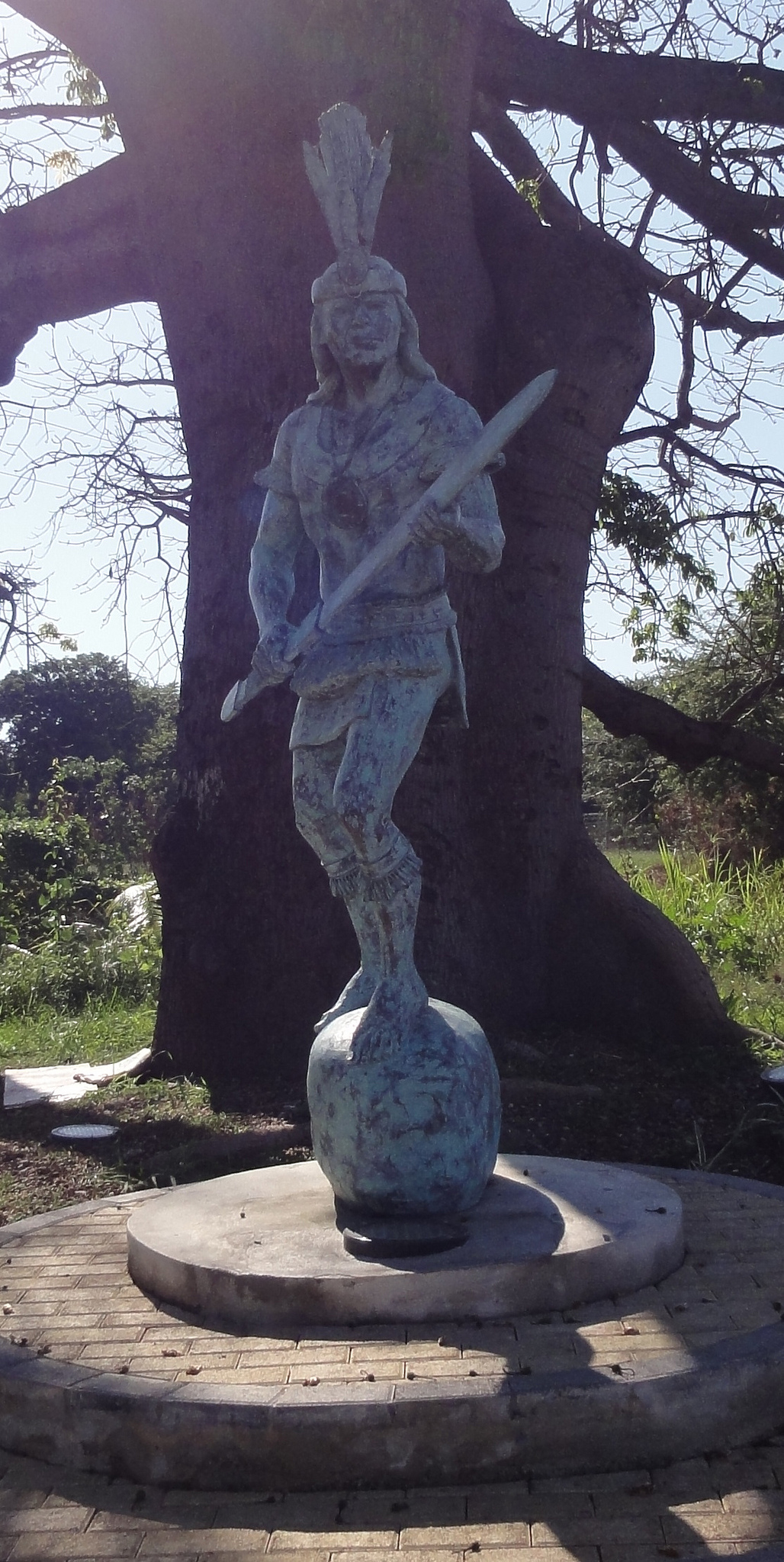
- Statue of Agüeybaná II, "El Bravo", in Ponce, Puerto Rico

Regions with significant populations
- Puerto Rico, Hispaniola, Cuba, Bahamas, Jamaica

Languages
- Taíno language, later Spanish, English, Creole

Religion
- Indigenous

This is a list of known Taíno, some of whom were caciques (male and female tribal chiefs).

The Taíno are the Indigenous inhabitants of the Bahamas, parts of the Greater Antilles, and some of the Lesser Antilles – especially in Guadeloupe, Dominica and Martinique. The Taíno ("Taíno" means "family") were peaceful seafaring people and distant relatives of the Arawakan-speaking peoples of South America.

Taíno society was divided into two classes: Nitaino (nobles) and the Naboria (commoners). Both were governed by chiefs known as caciques, who were the maximum authority in a Yucayeque (village). The chiefs were advised by priest-healers known as a Bohique and the Nitayno, which is how the elders and warriors were known.

Portrait	Name	Remarks
	Abey	Cacique (Chief) of yucayeque-(village) in the area of Abeyno Salinas, Puerto Rico. He fled to Hispaniola to what now is Dominican Republic after the 1511-16 Taino rebellion.
	Acanorex	Cacique on Ayiti (currently Hispaniola)
	Agüeybaná (The Great Sun)	Cacique whose name means "The Great Sun" was "Supreme Cacique" in Puerto Rico who welcomed Juan Ponce de León and the conquistadors. His yucayeque was on the Guayanilla Bay area. He was also known as Guaybana
	Agüeybaná II (The Brave)	Cacique Agüeybaná's brother. Agüeybaná II, who was also known as Güeybaná and Guaybana II, led the Taíno rebellion of 1511 in Puerto Rico against the Spanish settlers.
	Alonso	Minor Cacique of (Otoao) Utuado, Puerto Rico.
	Amanex	Cacique on Hispaniola
	Ameyro	Cacique of Jamaica, who lived on the eastern extremity of the island. He and Diego Mendez became great friends, exchanged names, which is a kind of token of brotherhood (Guatiao). Mendez engaged him to furnish provisions to his ships. He then bought an excellent canoe from the cacique, for which he gave a splendid brass basin, a short frock or cassock, and one of the two shirts which formed his stock of linen. The cacique furnished him with six Indians to navigate his bark, and they parted mutually well pleased.
	Anacaona	Cacica on Hispaniola. Wife of Caonabo, the Cacique of Maguana and sister of Cacique Bohechío, when his brother died, she became the Cacica of Jaragua. Reported to have had friendly encounters with escaped slaves.
	Aramaná	Cacique around Coa (Toa) river in Puerto Rico.
	Aramoca	Cacique on Hispaniola
	Arasibo	Cacique of yucayeque in the area of Río Abacoa (Río Grande de Arecibo) Arecibo, Puerto Rico.
	Ayamuynuex	Cacique on Hispaniola
	Aymamón	Cacique of yucayeque around Culebrinas river in Puerto Rico. Puerto Rican anthropologist Ricardo Alegría suggests that the proper pronunciation and name of the cacique was Aymaco, with Aymamón being a way of designating the cacique that ruled over the region called Aymamio, or possibly just a misunderstanding of the name's adequate pronunciation. However, historical documents have traditionally used the name Aymamón. He is known for having ordered the kidnapping of the son of Spaniard Pedro Xuarez. He called for a game at the batey among his subjects and offered as prize the honor of burning the Spaniard alive and hence proving their mortality and vincibility. However, the Spanish found out about the plan and Captain Salazar was sent to rescue the young Spaniard. In the subsequent battle, the son of Pedro Xuarez was rescued and Aymaco wounded. While healing, Aymaco called on Salazar to exchange names and offer peace. Despite his peace offering, he later participated in the Taíno Rebellion of 1511 which was also crushed.
	Ayraguay	Cacique on Hispaniola
	Bagnamanay	Cacique of the Caguas, Puerto Rico area.
	Baguanao	Cacique of Matanzas, Cuba Father of Cibayara
	Biautex	Cacique on Hispaniola
	Bojékio or Bohechio	Cacique elder on Hispaniola; brother of Anacaona, cacica of Xaragua
	Brizuela	Cacique of Baitiquirí, Cuba.
	Cacicaná	Cacique of Cueybá Cuba Provided food and shelter to Alonso de Ojeda who was shipwrecked on the Island of Cuba he was accompanied by seventy men and was seeking help. The pirate Bernardino de Talavera took Ojeda prisoner. A hurricane struck Talaveras ship and Talavera made amends and helped each other, despite their efforts the ship was shipwrecked at Jagua, Sancti Spíritus, on the south coast of Cuba. Ojeda decided to travel along the coast on foot with Talavera and his men in order to reach Maisí Point from where they would be able to get to Hispaniola. However, the party faced a number of difficulties en route and half of the men died of hunger, illness or other hardships that they met along the way. The sole possession remaining to Ojeda was an image of the Virgin Mary, which he had carried with him since he left Spain. He made a promise on this image that he would build a church dedicated to her in the first village that he reached where he was given hospitality. A little later, and with only a dozen men and the pirate Talavera still surviving, he arrived in the district of Cueybá where the chief Cacicaná provided food and shelter. Ojeda was true to his word and he built a small hermitage to the Virgin in the village, which was venerated by the local people. The party was rescued by Pánfilo de Narváez and taken to Jamaica, where Talavera was imprisoned for piracy. From Jamaica Ojeda returned to Hispaniola (Dominican Republic / Haiti where he learned that Fernández de Enciso had been able to relieve the colonists who had stayed in San Sebastián modern day Municipality of Necoclí in the subregion Urabá in the department Antioquia, Colombia.
	Cacimar	Cacique of Caribe ancestry, his yucayeque was in the "Isla de Bieque" (currently known as Vieques, Puerto Rico).
	Caguax	Cacique of yucayeque by the Turabo River of Caguas, Puerto Rico.
	Caguax II	Cacique who Reigned over the territory of Sabaneque Çaguax Sagua La Grande, Cuba.
	Camagüebax	Cacique Of Camagüey, and Father of Tínima Executed by Pánfilo de Narváez was killed and his body thrown from the highest elevation in Camagüey, the Tuabaquey hill in the Sierra de Cubitas mountains, (330 meters /1,083 ft.) above sea level.
	Canimao	Cacique of Matanzas, Cuba Husband of Cibayara father of Guacumao.
	Canóbana	Cacique of yucayeque around Cayniabón river (Río Grande de Loíza), Canóvanas, Puerto Rico.
	Caonabo	Cacique who ruled the province of Maguana, now part of the Dominican Republic. Married cacica Anacaona, from the neighboring Jaragua cacicazgo. He and Maynerí destroyed La Navidad.
	Caracamisa	Cacique of Cuba
	Careta	Cacique of Peru or Nicaragua
	Casiguaya	Wife of Guamá Captured in 1521 Hanged herself, Cuba.
	Cayacoa	Cacique of Higüey, currently in the Dominican Republic. After his death his wife the Cacica, baptized as Dona Ines (no relation to Agueybana's mother) married the Spaniard Miguel Díaza.
	Comerío	Cacique who ruled the region in the area Comerío, Puerto Rico. Son of the Cacique Caguax.
	Cotubanamá	Cacique of Higuey, currently in the Dominican Republic. Fought against the Spanish. He rebelled after a Cacique from Saona Island was assassinated. He was captured and taken to Santo Domingo, where he was hanged.
	Dagüao	Cacique of yucayeque at Santiago river, Naguabo, Puerto Rico.
	Doña Ines	Cacica, mother of Caciques Agueybaná and Agüeybaná II of Puerto Rico. Baptised by Juan Ponce de León in the year 1507.
	Doña María	Cacica, daughter of Cacique Bagnamanay. Her Taíno name is unknown.
	Enriquillo	Also known as Guarocuya. Cacique from the Barahona region that is currently the Dominican Republic, leader of a rebellion against the Spanish. Lake Enriquillo is named after him.
	Guababo	Cacique on Hispaniola
	Guacabo	Cacique of Boriqueñ, who governed the area close to the Cibuco River
	Guacanagaríx	Cacique on Hispaniola. He was the first cacique to befriend Columbus and helped save the men aboard the sinking Spanish vessel "Santa Maria" off the coast of Hispaniola. He also helped build Fort Navidad in La Navidad.
	Guacumao	Cacique of Matanzas, Cuba son of Canimao and Cibayara.
	Guaicaba	Cacique of Cuba who governed the area of Baní
	Guamayry	Cacique of Baracoa, Cuba also known as Oliguama. brother of Guamá. took over Chieftainship after he murdered his brother, as stated by Alexo a Taino warrior.
	Guamá	Cacique of Cuba fought the Spaniards at Baracoa Guamá was betrayed and murdered by his brother Guamayry also known as Oliguama.
	Guamá II	Cacique on Hispaniola, today a part of Haiti.
	Guaoconel	Cacique of Hispaniola
	Guaora	Cacique of Hispaniola
	Guarionex	Cacique from the cacicazgo of Maguá on Hispaniola. The subsequent Spanish colonization of the island forced thousands of Indians to other neighboring islands such as Borikén (Puerto Rico) to where he fled. Guarionex, meaning "The Brave Noble Lord", became the cacique of the village of Otoao or Utuado in Puerto Rico in 1493 Cacique of yucayeque in Utuado, Puerto Rico.
	Guatiguaná	Cacique of Hispaniola. He was the first Cacique to organize a rebellion in his land against the Spaniards
	Guayacayex	"Supreme" Cacique of Havana, Cuba He starred in one of the first Aboriginal rebellions in the region of Guanima. name given by the ancient inhabitants Present day Matanzas province. in 1510 When a Spanish ship from the mainland made landfall in Guanima Bay, the chief Guayacayex hatched a plan for revenge against the abuses that had been committed on his neighbors in the sister island of Ayiti/Quisqueya, he had information on the cruelty exercised by the colonizers on populations in that territory since Christopher Columbus's first voyage in 1492. Guanima's name was changed to Matanzas, meaning "Massacre" to commemorate the events of 1510.
	Guayaney	Cacique of Yabucoa, Puerto Rico, he was also known as Guaraca and Guaraca del Guayaney
	Güamaní	Cacique of yucayeque around Guayama, Puerto Rico or Manatí, Puerto Rico.
	Güaraca	Cacique of yucayeque in Guayaney in Puerto Rico.
	Habaguanex	Cacique of La Habana, Cuba.
	Hatuey	"Supreme" Cacique of Baracoa. Came from Hispaniola to fight the Spanish in Cuba.
	Hayuya	Cacique of Jayuya, Puerto Rico
	Haübey	Cacique of Guahaba, in what is now Santo Domingo. He organized a protest against Spanish rule in Cuba, and was jailed and burned alive.
	Huarea	Cacique of Western Jamaica. His village was located in what is now Montego Bay, Jamaica.
	Iguanamá	Cacica of Hispaniola; also known as Isabel de Iguanamá
	Imotonex	Cacique of Hispaniola
	Inamoca	Cacique of Hispaniola
	Jacaguax	Cacique who historian José Toro Sugrañes believed ruled the region of current Juana Díaz, Puerto Rico. The Jacaguas River was named in his honor.
	Jibacoa	Cacique of the area Majibacoa present day Las Tunas, Cuba
	Jumacao	Cacique of the area which includes the current city of Humacao, Puerto Rico, named in his honor.
	Loquillo	Cacique of the area of Luquillo (named after him) located in the northeastern coast of Puerto Rico. One of the last Cacique to fight against the Spanish invaders of the island.
	Luysa	Female cacique of Loíza, who converted to Christianity and was killed by the Carib Indians.
	Mabey	Cacique of Hispaniola; had arrived with Cacique Hatuey fleeing the Spanish on the island, pursued by the Spanish arrived at the Güinía Gold mines, of what is now the province of Villa Clara, Cuba in the municipality of Manicaragua stirring up a rebellion, the Spanish to prevent the rebellion intensified the search of Mabey. The center of operations of Cacique Mabey against the Spanish were at the foot of a hill called La Degollada. In the battle through the mountains, Taino rebels Baconao & Abama (Husband and wife) were killed. Mabey was surrounded and cornered at the edge of a cliff where he and Gálvez fought hand-to-hand the battle lasted various minutes, Gálvez's servant, an ambitious and cruel man saw the possibility of running away with treasure and pretending that he was helping Gálvez pushed both of them down the cliff where they fell to their death. The Spanish arrived with a group of captured Indians found out through Bacanao small daughter who was embracing the body of her dead mother (Abama), the truth about the crime. Gálvez's servant was taken prisoner as so were the Taino rebels and Baconao's Daughter. The Spanish buried Gálvez and left Mabey's cadaver to rot and be eaten by vultures. They then led the procession of indigenous prisoners to the presence of Capitan Vasco de Porcallo, which he ordered to the gallows. There, in the Loma de la Cruz, which bisects the town Güinía neighborhoods, the 12 Indians were hanged, the traitor (Gálvez's servant) was hung by his feet and shot in that position. There is an old legend of the town that on certain occasions people see a blue light on the scene where these events took place, preceded by a woman's scream.
	Mabodomaca	Cacique in the north west region near Guajataca. Also known as Mabodamaca
	Mabó	Cacique of Boriquen, from the area of Guaynabo, Puerto Rico
	Macaca	Cacique between Camagüey and Bayamo ruler of the Cacicazgo of Cueyba. This Cacique introduced himself to Martín Fernández de Enciso as (Comendador) he liked and appropriated this Spanish title which he had heard in reference to the former governor of Santo Domingo (Comendador Mayor Nicolás de Ovando) Nicolás de Ovando. another source states that in 1510 Sebastián de Ocampo was ordered by the governor of La Hispaniola Don Nicolás de Ovando to Coast and navigate the island of Cuba, there he was welcomed by Cacique Macaca, he founded a chapel and thereby Naming him (Comendador).
	Macuya	Cacique of the area of Coamo, Puerto Rico
	Majagua	Cacique of Boriquen, area of Bayamon, Puerto Rico
	Majúbiatibirí	Cacique of Hispaniola
	Manatiguahuraguana	Cacique of Cuba from the area of Trinidad, Cuba
	Maniabón	Cacique of Cuba, reigned over what is now Puerto Padre and Las Minas in the Municipality of Majibacoa in Las Tunas Province, Cuba.
	Manicatoex	Cacique of Hispaniola
	Maniquatex	Cacique of Hispaniola
	Maragüay	Cacique of Costa Firme in Aruaca (Venezuela)
	Maynerí	Cacique of Hispaniola whom destroyed La Navidad.
	Mayobanex	Cacique of Hispaniola of the Ciguayo region, the Samana Peninsula.(Dominican Republic)
	Naguabo	Cacique near the municipality of Naguabo, Puerto Rico.
	Nibagua	Cacique of Hispaniola
	Ornofay	Cacique of the Jaragueyal region what today now is known as Ciego de Ávila, Cuba.
	Orocobix	Cacique of the Jatibonicu region that covering the municipalities of Orocovis, Aibonito, Barranquitas, Morovis and Corozal in Puerto Rico.
	Tínima	Cacique Princess of Camagüey, Cuba and Daughter of Cacique Camagüebax, Married to Captain Vasco Porcallo de Figueroa Was also the founder of the Villa de Sancti Spíritus y de Sabaneque.
	Urayoán	Cacique of "Yucayeque del Yagüeka or Yagueca", who ordered the drowning of Diego Salcedo.
	Yacagüex	Cacique of Cuba
	Yacahüey	Cacique from Yucayo reigned over Havana and Matanzas, Cuba. Also Known as: Yaguacayo, Yaguacayex, Yacayeo, Yucayonex
	Yahíma	Daughter of the Cacique Jibacoa of Cuba
	Yaureibo	Cacique and brother of Cacique Cacimar on the island of Bieques (Vieques). He died in 1514, during a surprise attack by the Spaniards as he readied his men to attack the mainland to avenge his brother Cacimar's death.
	Yuisa (Luisa)	Cacica in the region near Loíza, Puerto Rico who was baptized by the Spaniards. She died in 1515, during a Carib raid on her land. She married a Spanish man called Pedro Mexias.
	Yuquibo	Cacique who ruled in the region of Luquillo. Known as Loquillo (Crazy One) by the Spaniards due to his constant attacks on the Conquistadors. The town of Luquillo, Puerto Rico is named for him.

== See also ==
- List of Puerto Ricans
- List of Cubans
- List of Dominicans (Dominican Republic)
- List of Haitians
- List of Bahamians
- List of Jamaicans
- Taíno
