= Guaynia =

Southern coast of Puerto Rico in pre-Columbian era

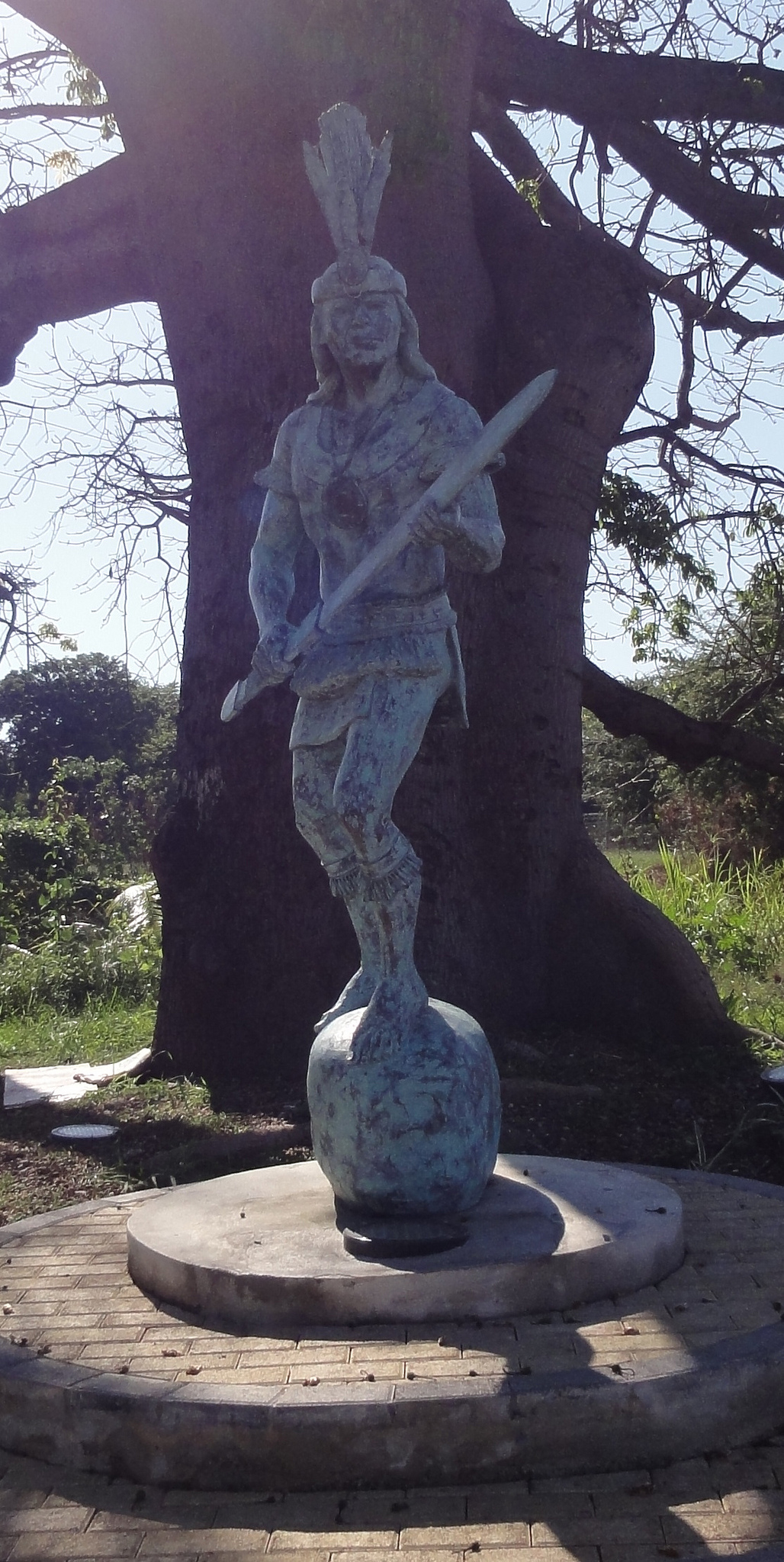
Statue of Agüeybaná II, The Brave

Guaynia was the territory that stretched along the southern coast of Puerto Rico in the pre-Columbian era. The Taino cacique (tribal chief) Agüeybaná ruled the area around Guayanilla when Christopher Columbus landed in Puerto Rico in 1493.
