= Agüeybaná II =

Taíno tribal leader and military chief

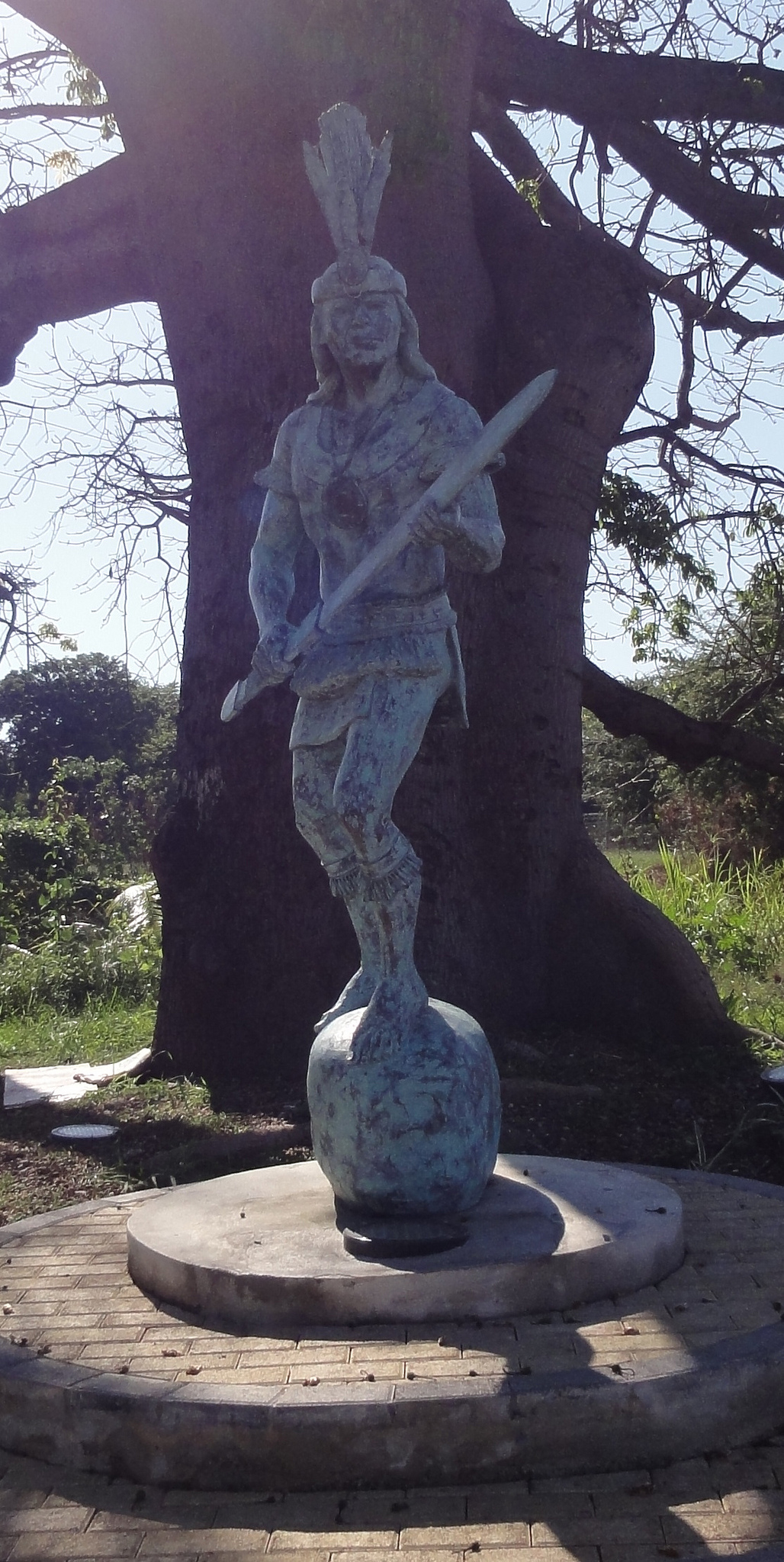
- Statue of Agüeybaná II, "El Bravo", in Ponce
- Born: c. 1470; Boriquen
- Died: 1511 (aged 40–41); Boriquen
- Relatives: Brother of Agüeybaná
- Military career
- Rank: Cacique
- Nickname: "El Bravo" (The Brave)
- Commands: Taínos of Boriquen
- Conflicts: Taíno rebellion of 1511

Agüeybaná II (c. 1470 – 1511), born Güeybaná and also known as Agüeybaná El Bravo (English: Agüeybaná The Brave), was one of the two principal and most powerful caciques of the Taíno people in Borinquen when the Spaniards first arrived there on November 19, 1493. Agüeybaná II led the Taínos of Puerto Rico in the Battle of Yagüecas, also known as the Taíno rebellion of 1511, against Juan Ponce de León and the Spanish Conquistadors.

== Introduction ==
Güeybaná, better known as Agüeybaná II, was the brother (Note: Some sources erroneously call him "the cousin") of the great cacique Agüeybaná and lived with his tribe in Guaynia (Guayanilla), located near a river of the same name on the southern part of the island. The name Agüeybaná means "The Great Sun", and he is often appended the "II" to differentiate him from his brother Agüeybaná, the other great cacique in Puerto Rico at the time of the arrival of the Spanish. All the other Caciques (Indian military chiefs) were subject to and had to obey Agüeybaná, even though they governed their own tribes.

== Arrival of the Conquistadors ==
Agüeybaná, the older, received Spanish conquistador Juan Ponce de León upon Ponce de León's arrival to Puerto Rico in 1508. According to an old Taíno tradition, Agüeybaná practiced the "guaytiao", a Taíno ritual in which he and Juan Ponce de León became friends and exchanged names. Agüeybaná's had obeyed his mother's advice to become friends with the Spaniards lest they all die at their hands. The hospitality and friendly treatment that the Spaniards received from Agüeybaná made it easy for the Spaniards to betray and conquer the island later. Agüeybaná's actions helped to maintain the peace between the Taíno and the Spaniards, a peace which was to be short-lived.

== Taíno rebellion of 1511 ==
Upon the senior Agüeybaná's death in 1510, his brother Güeybaná (better known as Agüeybaná II) became the most powerful Cacique in the entire island. Agüeybaná II had his doubts about the "godly" status of the Spaniards. He came up with a plan to test the perceived godly nature of the Spanish: he and Urayoán (cacique of Añasco) sent some of their tribe members to lure a Spaniard by the name of Diego Salcedo into a river and drown him. They watched over Salcedo's body to make sure that he would not resuscitate. Salcedo's death was enough to convince him and the rest of the Taíno people that the Spaniards were not gods.

Agüeybaná II, held Areytos (war dances) or secret meetings with others caciques where he organized a revolt against the Spaniards. Cristobal de Sotomayor sent a spy, Juan González, to one of the Areitos where he learned of Agüeybaná's plans. In spite of the warning, Agüeybana II killed Sotomayor and his men, and gravely wounded González. Juan González escaped making his way to Caparra where he reported the killings to Ponce de León. Meanwhile, Guarionex, cacique of Utuado, attacked the village of Sotomayor (present day Aguada) and killed eighty of its inhabitants. After this, Ponce de León led the Spaniards in a series of offensives against the Tainos that culminated in the Battle of Yagüecas.

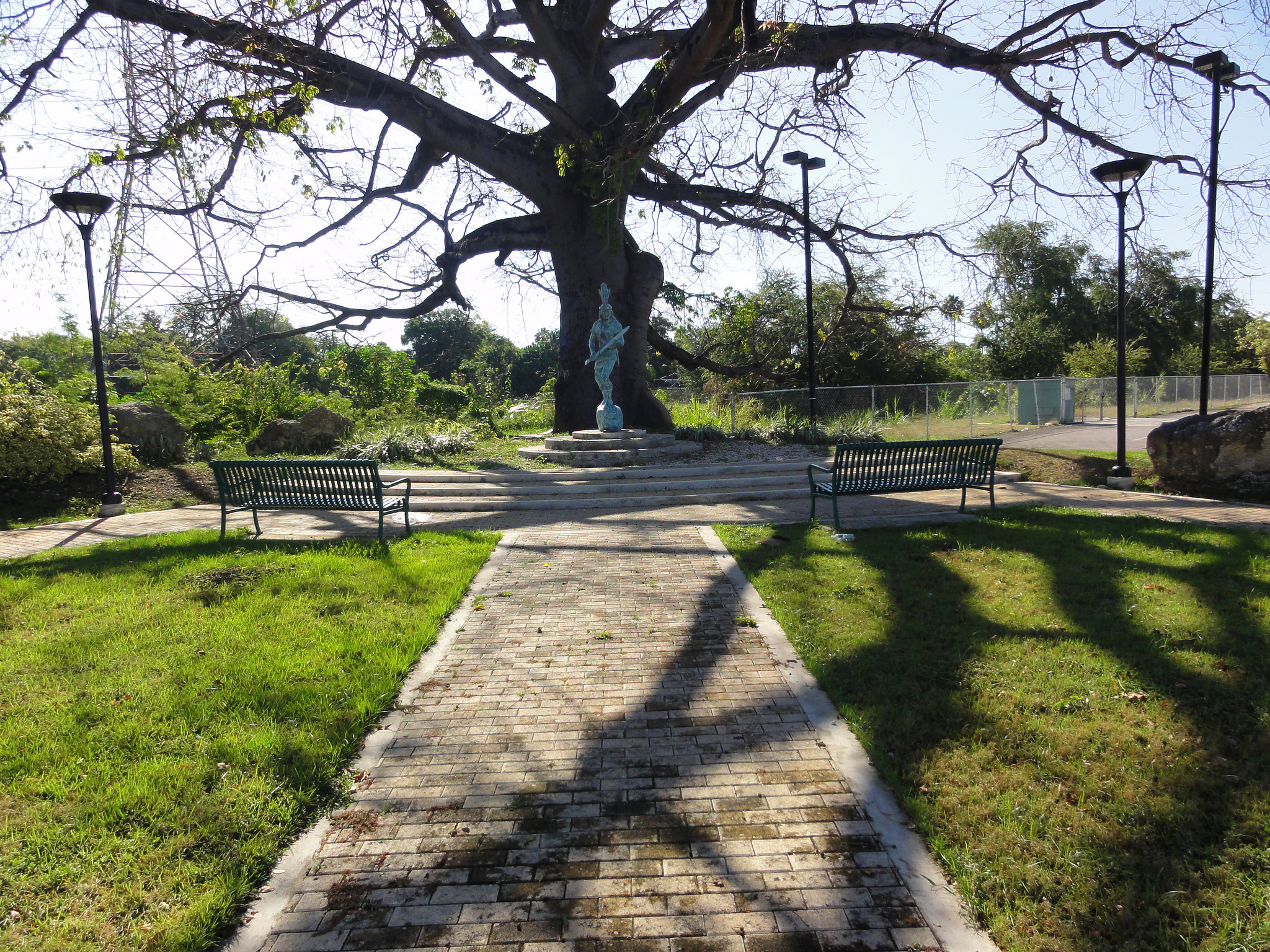
The Agüeybaná II ("El Bravo") Park in Ponce, Puerto Rico

== Death ==
In 1511, in the region known as Yagüecas some 11,000 to 15,000 Taínos had assembled against some 80 to 100 Spaniards. Before the start of the battle, a Spanish soldier using an arquebus shot and killed a native. It is presumed this was Agüeybaná II, because the warrior was wearing a golden necklace which only a cacique wore.

== Aftermath of the battle ==
After the death of Agüeybaná II, the native warriors retracted and became disorganized. Agüeybaná II's followers opted for engaging the Spaniards via guerrilla tactics. Such guerrilla warfare rebellion lasted for the next 8 years, until 1519. A second round of raids erupted in 1513 when Ponce de Leon departed the island to explore Florida. The settlement of Caparra, the seat of the island government at that time, was sacked and burned by an alliance between Taínos and natives from the northeastern Antilles.

By 1520 the Taíno presence in the Island had almost disappeared. A government census in 1530 reports the existence of only 1,148 Taínos remaining in Puerto Rico. However, oppressive conditions for the surviving Taíno continued. Many of those who stayed on the island soon died of either the cruel treatment that they had received or of the smallpox epidemic, which had attacked the island in 1519.

== Legacy ==
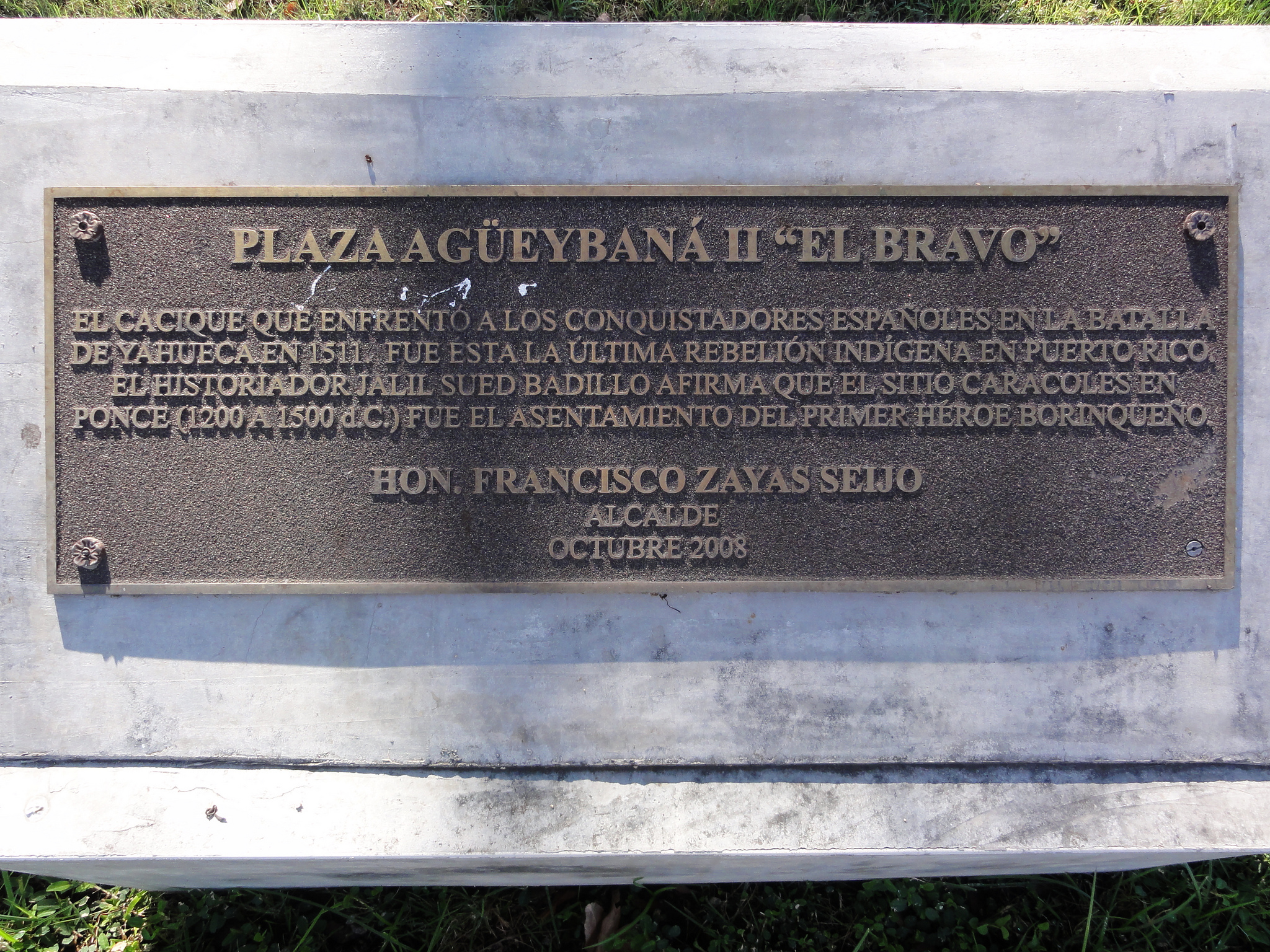
Plaque at Agüeybaná II ("El Bravo") Park in sector Caracoles, Barrio Playa, Ponce, Puerto Rico

Agüeybaná II is admired in Puerto Rico for his loyalty to his people. Puerto Rico has named many public buildings and streets after him:

- The City of Bayamón has named a high school after him.
- There is a street in Caguas that honors him.
- An avenue in the Hato Rey area of San Juan is named after Agüeybaná.
- Puerto Rico once had an equivalent to the Oscars which was awarded annually and was called the "Agüeybaná de Oro" (The Golden Agüeybaná), in honor of the great cacique.
- In the "Caracoles" sector of barrio Playa in Ponce, Puerto Rico, there is a small park with a statue depicting Agüeybaná II, "El Bravo" (The Brave). It is located on the southeast corner of the intersection of Ponce By-pass (PR-2) and Avenida Hostos (PR-123).
- Poet Daniel de Rivera composed a poem titled "Agüeybaná El Bravo" dedicated to him. It partially reads:

"¡Ea, compañeros! Vamos al combate: Honor la patria a defender nos llama; Si en paz, contento el corazón no late La guerra nos dará fortuna y fama; Hasta la mar que nuestra costa bate Ondas escupe y agitada brama, Que cual nosotros contemplar quisiera Libre esta perla de la gente ibera."	"Hey brothers! Let's go to the fight: The motherland calls us to defend our honor; If our hearts do not beat peacefully War will grant us fortune and fame; Even the sea that beats our shores Spits waves and rumbles with alarm, For like us it, too, would like to see Our pearl freed from the Iberian people."

== Ancestry ==
Ancestors of Agüeybaná II

2. Agüeybana I
1. Doña Inés
3. Agüeybana II

== See also ==
- List of Puerto Ricans
- Agüeybaná I
- List of Taínos
- Arasibo
- Caguax
- Hayuya
- Jumacao
- Orocobix
- Tibes Indigenous Ceremonial Center
