= Guamá =

Cuban Ciboney rebel chief

Guamá (died on June 6, 1533) was a Ciboney rebel chief who led a rebellion against Spanish rule in Cuba in the 1530s. Legend states that Guamá was first warned about the Spanish conquistador by Hatuey, a Taíno cacique from the island of Hispaniola.

== Biography ==
After the death of Spanish governor Diego de Velázquez (circa 1460–1524), Guamá led a series of bloody Indigenous uprisings against the Spanish that lasted for roughly 10 years. By 1530 Guamá had about fifty warriors and continued to recruit more pacified yndios. The rebellion mainly occurred in the extensive forests of the area of Çagua, near Baracoa in the easternmost area of Cuba, but also farther south and west in the Sierra Maestra.

Archaeologists and forensic pathologists believe that a body found in the Cuban mountains in February 2003 is indeed that of the legendary rebel chief Guamá.

According to the testimony of a captive Indian taken by the Spanish during the rebellion, Guamá was murdered by his brother Oliguama (or Guamayry), who buried an axe in his forehead while he slept, in 1533. According to oral tradition Oliguama, also spelled Holguoma, killed Guamá because of a sexual relationship between Guamá and Oliguama's wife.

The death of Guamá and the capture and execution of his warrior wife Casiguaya, plus the killing or dispersal of most of the group by a cuadrilla, a war party of Spanish, Indians and Blacks under the orders of Spanish governor Manuel de Rojas, ended major resistance to the Spanish by 1533. Brizuela of Baitiquirí (Zayas, 1914) fought on until about 1540, when he was captured and imprisoned.

== See also ==
- List of Cubans

== Sources ==
- Duarte Oropesa, José 1989 Historiología Cubana. Ediciones Universal Miami Vol 1. ISBN 0-89729-490-4, All volumes ISBN 84-399-2580-8
- Maso, Calixto C. 1998 Historia De Cuba. Ediciones Universal. 3rd Edition Miami ISBN 0-89729-875-6
- Rousset, Ricardo V. 1918. Historial de Cuba. Libreria Cervantes, Havana, Vol. 3 pp. 137–153.
- Zayas y Alfonso, Alfredo 1914. Lexografía Antillana El Siglo XX Press, Havana
