= Hayuya =

Indigenous cacique of Boriquen/Puerto Rico

Hayuya (born c. 1470s) was the Indigenous cacique (Taíno chief) who governed the area in Puerto Rico which now bears his name (which is now spelled "Jayuya").

== Arrival of the Conquistadors ==
When the Spaniards arrived in "Boriquen" (the Taíno name for Puerto Rico), they were greeted with open arms by the Taínos, who lived a peaceful and organized life. This made it easy for Juan Ponce de León and his men to conquer the island. Before the Spaniards arrived, the Taínos had a form of government where each region had a tribe headed by a Cacique. Some of the Caciques, like Hayuya, were more powerful than others. They all, however, responded to the "Supreme Cacique", which at that time was Agueybana. The area that Hayuya dominated is considered to be the "birth place" of the Taíno culture in the island.

However, the Spaniards soon started to enslave the natives. On February 1511, Agueybana's brother Güeybaná, better known as Agüeybaná II (The Brave), and Urayoan (The Añasco Cacique), and their men drowned Diego Salcedo. They watched Salcedo's body to see whether he would resuscitate: when he didn't, the Taínos realized that the Spaniards were not gods and thus, the Taínos became rebellious.

== Chronicles of the Indias ==
According to the Chronicles of the Indias which are found in Seville, Spain, Hayuya lived and governed the area which is now named after him, in the interior central part of Puerto Rico. On September 7, 1513, Juan Ponce de León, who was appointed governor by the "Spanish Crown", sent troops headed by Alonso Niño and Alonso de Mendoza to quash the rebellious Taínos. When they arrived at Hayuya's village, they proceeded to raid and murder its inhabitants. They burned the village to the ground. The Taínos that survived were taken as prisoners and some were made to work the mines as slaves. The others were sent to Spain where they were sold as slaves for 145 "pesos". Eventually, the Taínos died from working in the mines or from the smallpox epidemic.

== Legacy ==
The "National Indigenous Festival" (Festival Nacional Indígena) which honors the memory of Hayuya and the Taíno heritage is celebrated annually on November 24 in the town of Jayuya. There is a monument of Hayuya, the only one of its kind to be dedicated to a Taíno Cacique, located in Jayuya's Cultural Center next to a Taíno tomb. It was sculpted by Puerto Rican artist Tomás Batista in 1969. Hayuya is also represented in the town's coat of arms.

== See also ==
- List of Puerto Ricans
- List of Taínos
- Agüeybaná
- Agüeybaná II
- Arasibo
- Jumacao
- Orocobix
- Tibes Indigenous Ceremonial Center
