= Brizuela =

Brizuela is a family name that has Spanish origin. It takes its name from the so-called village, near Villarcayo (Burgos). They founded houses in the place of San Martín de Olías, in the town of Medina de Pomar, in the town of Valmayor de Cuesta Uría and in the valley of Aedo, all in the aforementioned province. Other lines of this lineage were extending through the provinces of Segovia, Palencia, León and Soria. Also a branch settled in the Valencian region.

Notable people with the surname include:

- Brizuela, Cacique of Baitiquirí, Cuba
- Bárbara M. Brizuela, American academic, Professor of Education at Tufts University
- Braulio Brizuela (born 1988), Paraguayan footballer
- Daniel Brizuela (boxer) (born 1985), featherweight boxer from Argentina
- Daniel Brizuela (footballer) (born 1968), Argentine footballer and manager
- Eduardo Brizuela del Moral (born 1944), Argentine Radical Civic Union (UCR) politician
- Gabriel Brizuela (born 1979), Argentine professional racing cyclist
- Hugo Brizuela (born 1969), Paraguayan football striker
- Isaác Brizuela (born 1990), Mexican footballer
- Nelson Brizuela (born 1950), Paraguayan footballer and manager
- Leopoldo Brizuela (1963–2019), Argentine writer and translator

== See also ==
- Atemajac de Brizuela, municipality and town in Jalisco, Mexico
