= Arasibo =

Taino Cacique in Puerto Rico

The crown in the coat of arms of the city of Arecibo represents the glory of Aracibo

Aracibo (born c. 1480s) was an Indigenous cacique (Taíno chief) in Puerto Rico who governed the area which is now named after him (now spelled Arecibo).

== Pre-Columbian era ==
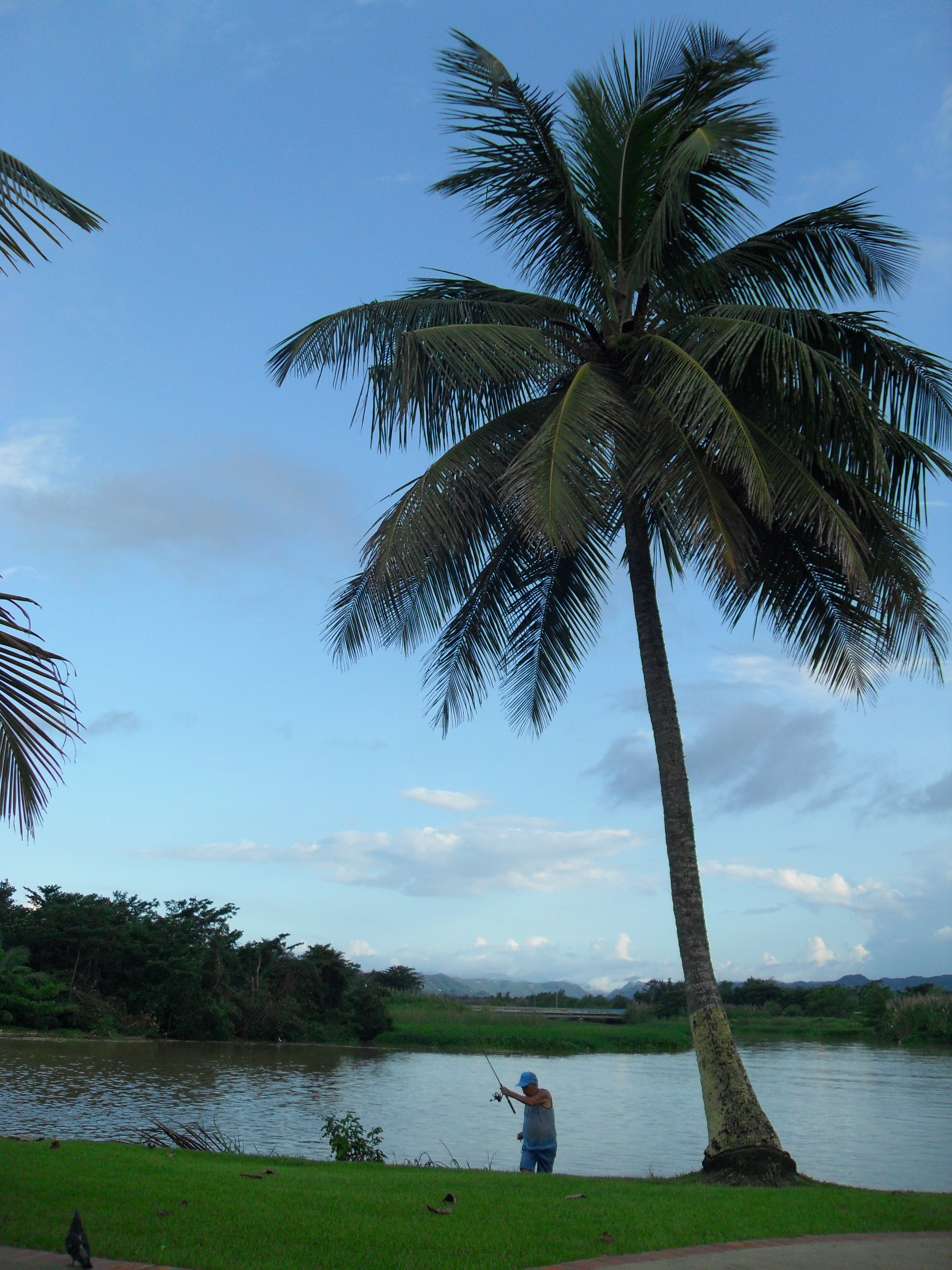
Fishing at Rio Abacoa in Arecibo

Aracibo governed a tribe whose village was located by the shore of the river "Abacoa" (now known as the "Río Grande de Arecibo"). Aracibo had been known to be a "just" and respected cacique and his tribe had led a peaceful existence before the arrival of the Spaniards. The rivers close to the village were full of fish and turtles and so it was only natural that the members of Aracibo's tribe were fishermen. Their land produced many fruits, such as papayas; the tribe were cultivators of corn. Aracibo loved to collect various animals and birds. He, like the rest of the other Caciques, reported only to the "Supreme Cacique" Agüeybaná.

== Arrival of the Conquistadors ==
The relationship between the Spaniards and the Taínos was peaceful at first, however, all that changed when the Conquistadores started to enslave the natives. In 1511, Agueybana's brother Güeybaná, better known as Agüeybaná II (The Brave), discovered that the Spaniards were not "gods" and this encouraged the Cacique to rebel against the invaders. The rebellion failed after Juan Ponce de León's troops confronted and killed Agüeybaná II.

== Crónicas de Arecibo ==
In the Crónicas de Arecibo written by Puerto Rican historian Cayetano Coll y Toste, Toste states that his research and investigations led him to uncover the following facts. In the year 1515, all of the area of Arecibo including the rivers of "Rio Grande" and "Tanama" were given as a gift to a Lope Conchillos (who resided in Spain) by the Spanish Crown. Conchillos sent a helper by the name of "Pedro Moreno" to the island to administer his lands; Moreno found Aracibo and his tribe of about 200 Taínos living in the land; he then enslaved them and Aracibo and his people died shortly after.

== Legacy ==
The crown in the coat of arms of the City of Arecibo represents the glory of the Cacique Aracibo, who was the first known ruler of the region.

== See also ==
- List of Puerto Ricans
- List of Taínos
- Agüeybaná I
- Agüeybaná II
- Hayuya
- Jumacao
- Orocobix
- Tibes Indigenous Ceremonial Center
