= Jumacao =

Taíno Cacique (Chief) of Humacao, Puerto Rico

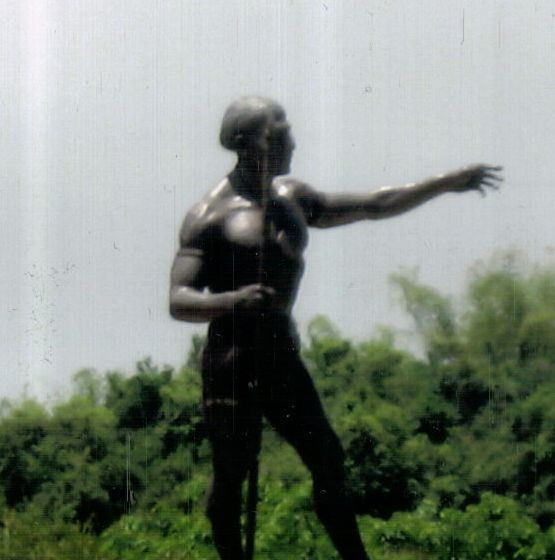
Statue of Cacique Jumacao

Jumacao a.k.a. Jumaca (born c. 1480s) was the Indigenous cacique (Taíno chief) of the area in Puerto Rico named after him (now spelled Humacao).

== Before and after the arrival of the Conquistadors ==
The Taínos, who lived in Puerto Rico long before the arrival of the Spaniards, were organized and peaceful people. The Cacique was the head of the tribe and the governor of his region. They reported to the "Supreme Cacique", who during Jumacao's time was the Cacique Agueybana. When the Spaniards arrived, Agueybana received Juan Ponce de León with open arms. This extended friendship was soon to end because the Conquistadores started to enslave the Taínos and to destroy their way of life.

== Taíno revolt ==
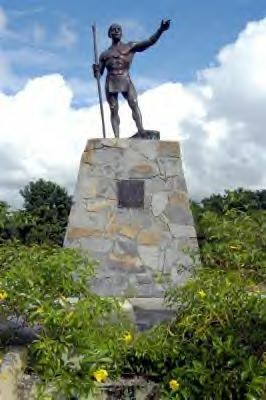
Statue of Cacique Jumacao

According to the "Chronicles of the Indias", which are kept in Seville, Spain, in February 1511, Agueybana's brother Güeybaná, better known as Agüeybaná II (The Brave), Urayoan, the Cacique of Añasco and some of their men drowned the Spanish soldier Diego Salcedo. They watched over Salcedo's body to see if he came back to life. When he did not, the Taínos realized that the Spaniards were not gods after all.

When the news spread among the Taínos, they started a rebellion and attacked some Spanish settlements. After Ponce de León's troops killed the Cacique Agueybana II, the Spanish Government reached an agreement and signed a peace treaty. However, the Spaniards in the island did not respect the treaty and continued to enslave and destroy many of the Taíno villages.

The Cacique Jumacao was the first Cacique to learn how to read and write in Spanish. He proved this by writing a letter to King Charles I of Spain, complaining that the appointed governor of the island was not honoring the peace treaty and that he and the other Caciques had virtually become prisoners of the governor. He also stated that he was responsible for his own acts. The King was moved by the letter and ordered the governor to honor the terms of the treaty.

The government, however, paid no attention to the King's request and continued to abuse the Taínos. Jumacao, together with the help of the Cacique Daguao (Cacique of Naguabo), attacked Spanish settlements and burned down the City of Santiago (founded in 1513), which was located close to the Daguao (now Santiago) River, killing all of its inhabitants. According to the testimony of Ignacio Martinez, the sole survivor of the "Santiago incident", the Caciques and their tribes hid in the Sierras (mountains) of Luquillo. Jumacao was never heard from again.

== Legacy ==
There is a statue of the Cacique in the city of Humacao. In 1975, the city of Humacao honored the Cacique Jumacao by including a crown within its Municipal Coat of Arms, which represents the royalty of the Cacique. The City of Humacao also presents the "Cacique Jumacao Award" to the best industries in regard to its recycling programs.

== See also ==
- List of Puerto Ricans
- Agüeybaná I
- Agüeybaná II
- List of Taínos
- Arasibo
- Hayuya
- Orocobix
- Tibes Indigenous Ceremonial Center
