= Orocobix =

Taino chief of the central area of Puerto Rico

Orocobix was the principal regional Indigenous cacique (Taíno chief) of the central mountain region of Puerto Rico called Jatibonicu in the 16th century. The Jatibonicu territorial region covered the present day municipalities of Aibonito, Orocovis, Barranquitas, Morovis and Corozal. The Taíno language name Orocobix or O-roco-bis literally means: 'Remembrance of the First Great Mountain.'

The seat of power of Orocobix's kingdom and caney (longhouse) was located in the town of Aibonito. Orocobix was the first cousin of Cacique Agüeybaná (The Great Sun). His wife was named "La Cacica" Yayo, she was the mother of Cacica Catalina. Cacique Orocobix and Cacica Yayo were both later enslaved in the year 1514 and worked in the Royal Mines of the King of Spain, in Utuado. Orocobix also had a younger brother, named Cacique Oromico, who was the chief of the tribal region of Horomico, that today bears the same name of the town of Hormigueros.

Surveyors in 1952 claimed that Palo Hincado, a barrio in Barranquitas may have been the home of Orocobix.

== See also ==
- List of Puerto Ricans
- Agüeybaná
- Agüeybaná II
- List of Taínos
- Arasibo
- Hayuya
- Jumacao
- Tibes Indigenous Ceremonial Center
