= Indigenous peoples of Puerto Rico =

The history of the Indigenous peoples of Puerto Rico began with the settlement of the Ortoiroid people before 430 BCE. Following the arrival of Christopher Columbus in the New World in 1493 and the European colonization of the Caribbean, the Indigenous population of Puerto Rico became dangerously low during the later half of the 16th century because of new infectious diseases, exploitation by Spanish settlers, and warfare. The island was known as Boriquen or Borinquen by the Indigenous people of the island.

== Terminology ==
The Indigenous people of Puerto Rico did not refer to themselves as Taíno or Arawak. These terms were later applied to Indigenous Puerto Ricans by non-Indigenous writers and scholars. According to the archaeologist L. Antonio Curet, scholars began describing the Indigenous population of Puerto Rico as "Taíno" during the 20th century. Curet has written that the emphasis on Taíno identity in Puerto Rico has overshadowed African heritage, writing that "the concept of Taíno as a generalized, ill-defined cultural unit has found its way into the popular culture, literature, and school textbooks of the Caribbean, and it is so strongly rooted in the local conception of culture in cases such as Puerto Rico and the Dominican Republic that it has been purposefully used in the creation or invention of national identities...in many instances, the so-called Taíno culture has a more preeminent role in these identities than, say, the African inlfuence, despite the fact that large parts of the population show strong cultural and biological connections with the latter."

In 1897, the Puerto Rican historian Cayetano Coll y Toste criticized the scientific basis of the term "Taíno" and referred to Indigenous Puerto Ricans as borinqueños instead.

The 20th century archaeologist Irving Rouse classified Indigenous Puerto Ricans and Indigenous Hispaniolans as "Classic Taínos".

== History ==
=== Precontact history ===
The first wave of Indigenous people to settle the Caribbean was the Casimiroid. Some scholars have suggested that the Casimiroid may have reached western Puerto Rico, but this has not been confirmed. The first documented people to settle on Puerto Rico were the Ortoiroid people who migrated from the Orinoco region of South America. According to the archaeologist Irving Rouse, the Ortoiroid presence in Puerto Rico dates back as far as 2000 BCE.

The Ortoiroid people were displaced by the Saladoid people who also came from the Orinoco region, arriving in Puerto Rico between 430 and 250 BCE.

=== Postcontact history ===
==== 15th century ====
Christopher Columbus and his crew were the first Europeans to visit Puerto Rico when they landed on November 19, 1493. The devastation of the Indigenous population following Spanish colonization due to disease, warfare, and slavery lead to the importation of large numbers of African slaves to work on plantations.

==== 19th century ====
There was no option for Indigenous people in the 1887 Puerto Rico census, the last Puerto Rican census taken under Spanish rule. All islanders were classified as white or colored, with a sub-category for mulatto. The first US census held in Puerto Rico, the 1899 Puerto Rico census, did not have an option for Indigenous, only listing options for white, colored, and mulatto.

==== 20th century ====
No Indigenous option for Puerto Rico was included on the 1910 United States census or the 1920 United States census. The first Puerto Rican census to list "Indian" as an option was the 1930 United States census, wherein a total of 5 individuals (3 men and two women) were listed as Indian.

== Contemporary Indigenous ancestry ==
According to genetic studies, many contemporary Puerto Ricans have ancestry partially Indigenous to the Americas, along with ancestry from Africa and Europe. As it is impossible for genetic testing to determine tribal ancestry, it is unknown whether the Indigenous ancestry comes from Indigenous Puerto Ricans or from other Indigenous populations, such as the Native Americans who were forcibly imported to Puerto Rico as enslaved people. According to genetic testing that compared contemporary Puerto Rican genetics to the genetics of an 8th-10th century tooth found in the Bahamas, many Puerto Ricans partly descend from an Indigenous population that was genetically similar to the Indigenous population of the medieval Bahamas.

== Contemporary Indigenous identity ==
Taíno-identifying organizations can be found in Puerto Rico and the Puerto Rican diaspora. Self-identification as Taíno in more common among Stateside Puerto Ricans than among Puerto Ricans living in Puerto Rico.

In the 2020 United States census, 17,870 individuals are listed as American Indian and Alaska Native alone (AIAN), making up 0.54% of the Puerto Rican population.

== See also ==
- Ciboney
- Ciguayos
- Guanahatabey
- History of Puerto Rico
- Indigenous peoples of the Caribbean
- Kalinago
- Lucayans
- Macorix people
- Native Americans in the United States
