= Agüeybaná I =

Puerto Rican cacique

Agüeybaná

Cacique of Boriquen
- Reign: c. 1508 - 1510
- Successor: Agüeybaná II
- Born: Boriquen
- Died: 1510; Boriquen
- Military career
- Relatives: Brother of Güeybaná (better known as Agüeybaná II)
- Allegiance: Taíno people
- Service years: Late 1400s and early 1500s
- Rank: Cacique
- Nickname: "The Great Sun"
- Commands: Taíno of Boriquen

Agüeybaná (died 1510) was the principal and most powerful cacique (Note: "...Mas sobre todos estos caciques se distingue la figura de Agüeybaná I, Señor de las tierras de Guanica...Los demás jefes indígenas le rinden homenaje de sumisión y acuden presurosos a su llamada. Esta autoridad de Agüeybaná I pasa a su pariente Agüeybaná II tras su muerte...") (chief) of the Taíno people in Boriquen, modern-day Puerto Rico, when the Spanish first arrived on the island on November 19, 1493.

== Etymology ==
Agüeybana, which has been interpreted by 19th and 20th century authors as meaning "The Great Sun", was the hereditary title shared by the family that ruled the theocratic monarchy of Borinquen, governing the hierarchy over the rest of the regional chiefs or caciques. Like other nobiliary recognitions within Kalinago culture, it was passed down through the maternal bloodline. The Spanish settlers Hispanicized the title to be the equivalent of the European concept of kings, with contemporary writers such as Juan de Castellanos and Gonzalo Fernández de Oviedo y Valdés employing the title of Rey Agüeybana (English: "King Agüeybana") when referring to the second monarch to lead the Taíno during the 1510s. By the 1800s, the terms "king" and "cacique" were used exchangeably by both local and Spanish authors, but a resurgence in the interest concerning Kalinago history during the 20th century led to the popularization of native words and the latter term gained more lexical prominence.

== Arrival of the conquistadors ==
Agüeybaná received the Spanish conquistador Juan Ponce de León upon his arrival in 1508. According to an old Taíno tradition, Agüeybaná practiced the "guaitiao," a Taíno ritual in which he and Juan Ponce de León became friends and exchanged names. Ponce de León then baptized the cacique's mother into Christianity and renamed her Inés.

The cacique joined Ponce de León in the exploration of the island. After this had been accomplished, Agüeybaná accompanied the conquistador to the island of La Española (what today comprises the nations of the Dominican Republic and Haiti), where he was well received by the Governor Nicolás de Ovando. Agüeybaná's actions helped to maintain the peace between the Taíno and the Spaniards, a peace which was to be short-lived.

The hospitality and friendly treatment that the Spaniards received from Agüeybaná made it easy for the Spaniards to betray and conquer the island. After a short period of peace, the Taínos were forced to work in the island's gold mines and in the construction of forts as slaves. Many Taínos died as a result of the cruel treatment which they received.

== Death and aftermath ==
Upon Agüeybaná's death in 1510, his brother Güeybaná (better known as Agüeybaná II) became the most powerful Cacique in the island. Agüeybaná II was troubled by the treatment of his people by the Spanish and attacked them in battle. The Taíno were ultimately defeated at the Battle of Yagüecas.

Taínos in Puerto Rico either abandoned the island, were forced to labor as slaves; others were killed off by Spaniard artillery- in what was thought to be, until recently, a complete extinction.

Recent genetic studies published between 2018 and 2019 revealed that Taino blood ancestry is still present in the genome of Puerto Ricans. The analyses revealed a narrative more indicative of assimilation and migrations to nearby islands rather than extinction. Although many succumbed to the smallpox epidemic that attacked the islanders in 1519, others survived the genetic bottleneck to produce progeny.

== Legacy ==
Agüeybaná is admired in Puerto Rico for his dedication to his people and attempting to keep the peace. Puerto Rico has named many public buildings and streets after him:

- The City of Bayamón has named a high school after him.
- There is a street in Caguas that honors him.
- An avenue in the Hato Rey area of San Juan is named after Agüeybaná.
- Puerto Rico once had an equivalent to the Grammy Award which was awarded annually and was called the "Agüeybaná de Oro" (The Golden Agüeybaná), in honor of the great cacique.

Many songs and poems, by poets such as Juan Antonio Corretjer, among others, have been written about Agüeybaná.

== See also ==
- List of Puerto Ricans
- Agüeybaná II
- List of Taínos
- Arasibo
- Hayuya
- Jumacao
- Orocobix
- Tibes Indigenous Ceremonial Center
