= Guabancex =

Taíno goddess of storms

Guabancex is the zemi or deity of chaos and disorder in Taíno mythology and religion, which was practiced by the Taíno people in Puerto Rico, Hispaniola, Jamaica, and Cuba, as well as by Arawakan-speaking peoples elsewhere in the Caribbean. She was described as a mercurial goddess that controlled the weather, conjuring storms known as "juracán" when displeased. The latter term was later used to name the climatological phenomenon that is now known as a hurricane in the Western Hemisphere.

The Taínos were aware of the spiraling wind pattern of hurricanes, a knowledge that they used when depicting the deity. Her zemi idol was said to depict a woman, but the most common depiction of Guabancex presents a furious face with her arms extended in a "~" pattern.

== Etymology ==
The Spanish word huracán may be derived from juracán. The English word hurricane derives from the Spanish. There are many alternative spellings listed in the OED: furacan, furican, haurachan, herycano, hurachano, hurricano, and so on.

The term made an early appearance in William Shakespeare's King Lear (Act 3, Scene 2) and in Troilus and Cressida (Act 5, Scene 2), in which Shakespeare gives the following definition:

the dreadful spout Which shipmen do the hurricano call, Constringed [i.e., compressed] in mass by the almighty sun.

== Mythology ==
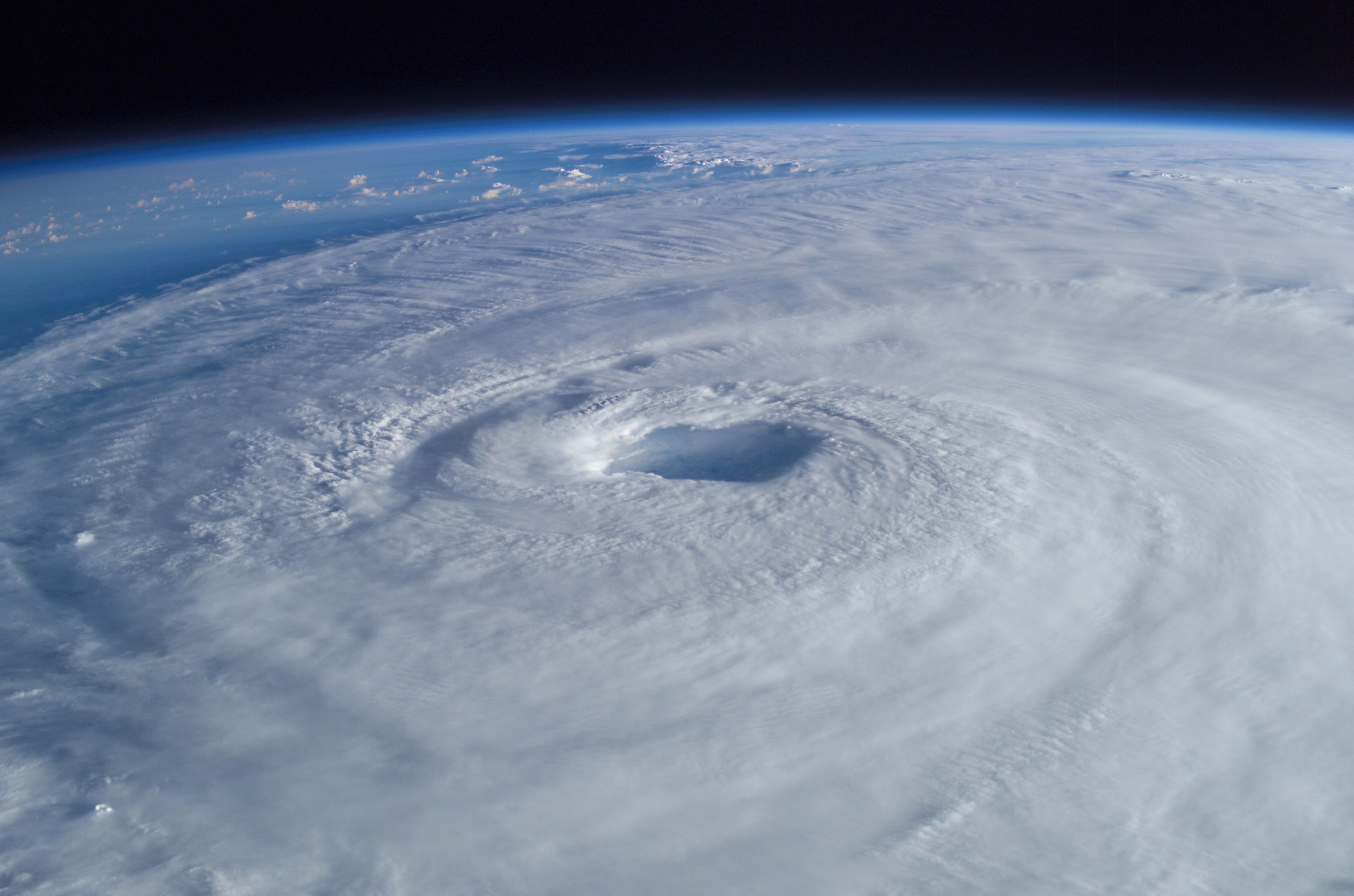
A fierce deity, Guabancex was the personification of destruction. A trait that the Taíno associated with the catastrophic nature of Atlantic hurricanes.

Guabancex is a zemi of storms aided by Coatriquie, and Guataubá, who control wind and rainfall. She was entrusted to the ruler of a mystical land, Aumatex. This granted her the title of "Cacique of the Wind", but it also imposed the responsibility of repeatedly appeasing the goddess throughout her long reign. Furthermore, due to the importance of the wind for travel between island and the need of good weather imperative for a successful crop, other caciques would offer her part of their food during the cohoba ceremony. However, given Guabancex's volatile temper, these efforts often failed. When they did, she would leave her domain enraged and with the intent of bringing destruction to all in her path, unleashing the juracánes.

She began by interrupting the balance established by Boinayel and Marohu, the deities of rain and drought. By rotating her arms in a spiral, Guabancex would pick the water of the ocean and land, placing it under the command of Coatrisquie, who violently forced it back over the Taíno settlements destroying their bohios and crops. She would threaten the other deities in an attempt to have them join the chaos. She was always preceded by Guataubá, who heralded her eventual arrival with clouds, lightning and thunder.

The easternmost of the Greater Antilles, Puerto Rico is often in the path of the North Atlantic tropical storms and hurricanes which tend to come ashore on the east coast. The Taíno believed that upon reaching the rainforest peak of El Yunque, the goddess and her cohorts would clash with their supreme deity, Yúcahu, who was believed to live there. It is also said that she is a manifestation of Atabey’s anger.

Guabancex has an unspecified connection to Caorao, a deity that was also associated with storms and that was said to bring them forth by playing the cobo, a musical instrument made from a marine sea shell.

== See also ==
- Huracan

== Bibliography ==
- Author unknown (2008-07-30). El dios Juracán era una deidad femenina ["God Juracan was a feminine Goddess"]. Primera Hora ["First Hour"], Spanish, 30 July 2008. Retrieved from http://www.primerahora.com/noticias/puerto-rico/nota/eldiosjuracaneraunadeidadfemenina-215036/.
