= Museo el Cemí =

History museum in Coabey, Jayuya, Puerto Rico

Coordinates: 18°12′38″N 66°33′42″W

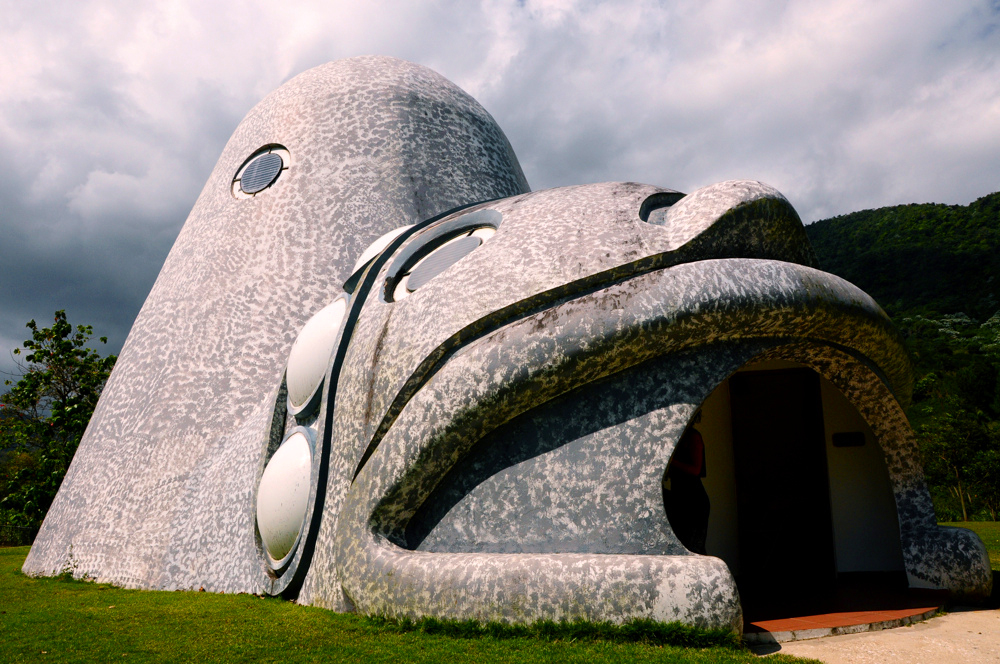
View of the Cemí museum

The Museo el Cemí is a history museum in Coabey barrio in Jayuya, Puerto Rico which opened in 1989. The museum building is a replica of a Cemí and showcases Taíno artifacts.

== Description ==
The museum building was designed and built in the shape of a Cemí, a Taíno deity and is on PR-144 in Coabey, Jayuya. The museum's inauguration was in 1989.

Cemís were Taíno deities.

== Gallery ==
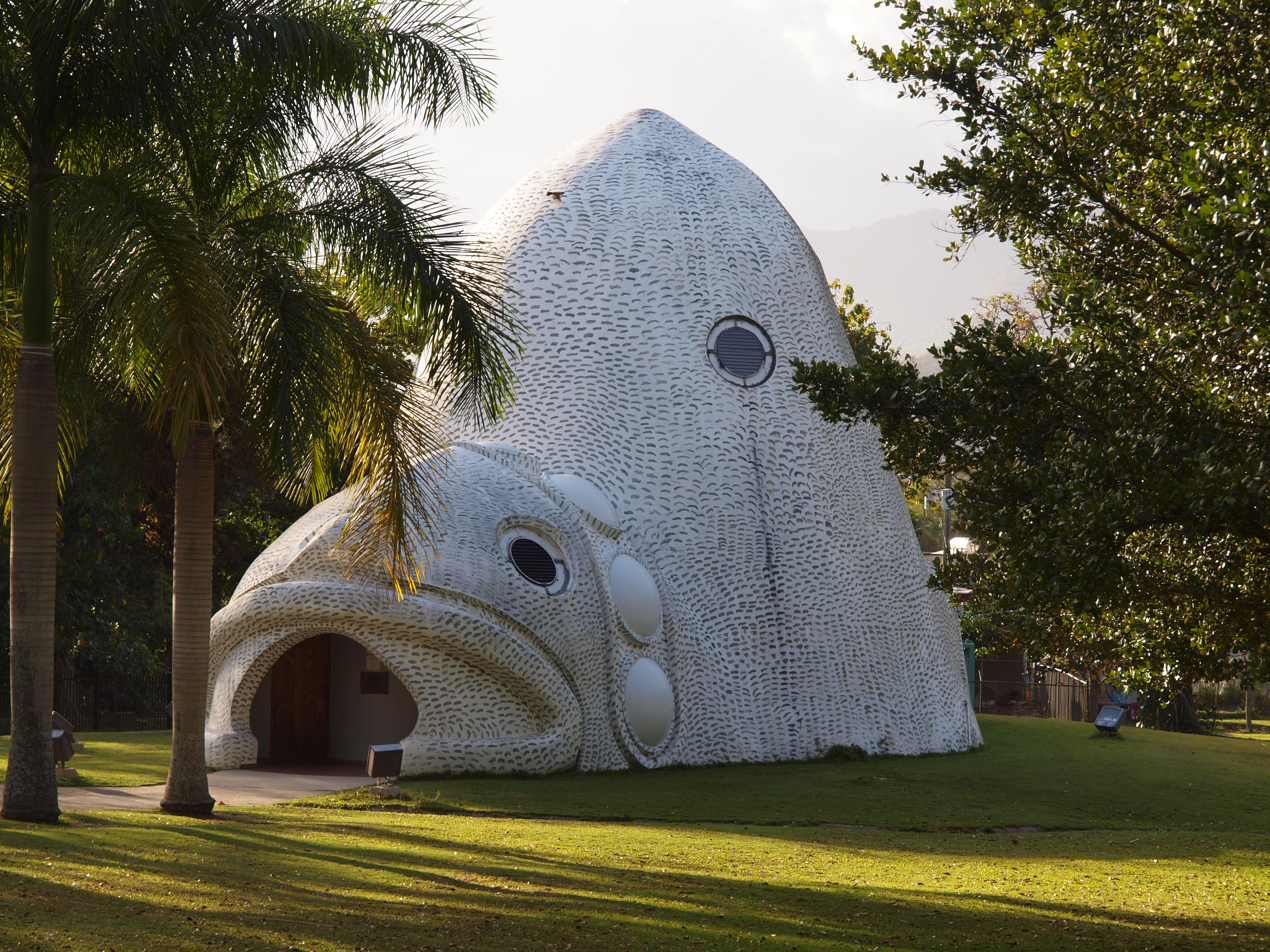

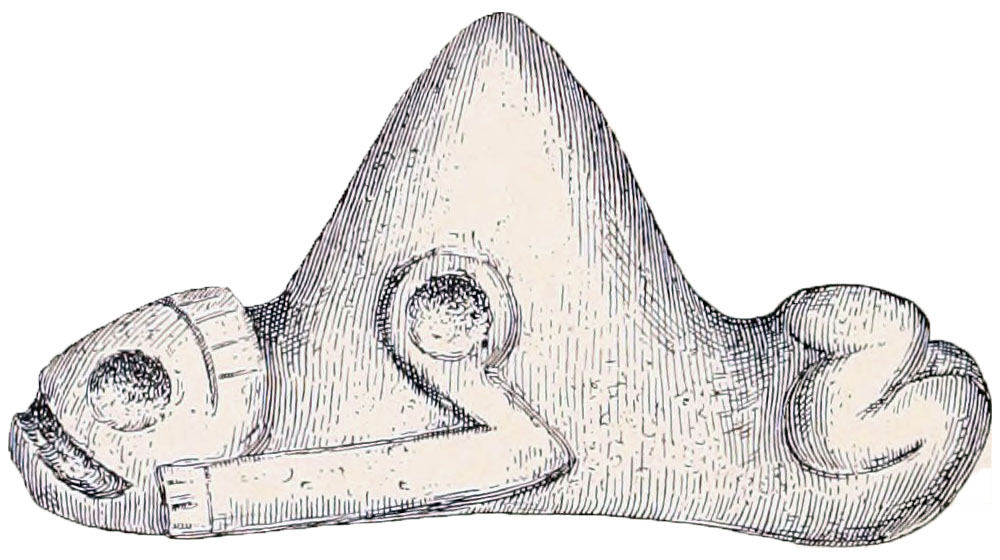
Three-pointed stone Cemí is a specimen which was owned by Mr. Yunghannis, of Bayamón, Puerto Rico

== See also ==
- Puerto Rican art
