= Taíno mythology =

Mythological beliefs of the Taíno

Taíno mythology is the body or collection of myths of the Taíno in Cuba, Puerto Rico, Dominican Republic, Haiti and the Greater Antilles. The Arawakan-speaking Taíno recorded their mythology in communal sacred performances called areitos which are mostly lost. Areitos involved complex elaborations in dance, music, oratory, fabric, and trance. They also performed areitos for important social events like harvest time and births, marriages, and deaths of chiefs.

Taíno religious practice was centered on veneration of zemis, ancestors, and mythic heroes within a perception that had no distinction between natural and supernatural. Zemis generally held away over specific natural domains, processes, rhythms, and resources. Yucahu, son of mother goddess Atabey, for example, was the god of cassava or yucca, the primary food source of the Taíno. Opiyelguobiran, the soul dog, ferried dead souls between realms. Religion was administered by priests (behikes or bohikes), and chiefs or kasikes (cacique) aulso played important roles. Chiefs like Anacaona for example, were poets and musicians who actively contributed to the mythic archive of areitos.

While Taíno mythology or religion is a cogent entity, it's important to keep in mind the internal diversity of Greater Antillean religion. The so-called Classic Taíno had distinct but overlapping beliefs from the Igneri. Both also existed alongside non-Arawakan religions and cultures like the Kalinago or Igneri, the Macorix, the Siwayo or Ciguayo, and the Guanahatabey.

== Creation mythology ==
Taíno creation myths are symbolic narratives about the origins of life, the Earth, and the universe, intrinsically shaped from the nature of the tropical islands the Taíno inhabited. The Taíno people were the predominant Indigenous people of the Caribbean and were the ones who encountered the explorer Christopher Columbus and his men in 1492. They flourished across much of the Caribbean for nearly 1,000 years before the arrival of Europeans and were one of the region’s most developed cultures.

The creation myths of the Taínos share similarities with other Native American cosmologies. The belief that in ancient mythical times, floods and civilizing heroes befell the world constitutes one of the most widespread concepts in Native American mythology, including in Indigenous Taíno myths. Their creation myths are presented in terms of narratives where the events and the actors belong to a remote, primordial cosmos. A common feature of these myths is the expression of social laws that formulate proper and improper behavior; either characters behave in an opposite way from what is expected of an ordinary Taíno, or their behavior establishes proper Taínan behavior to be followed, and often a myth will exhibit an interplay of both kinds of behavior.

=== Stories ===
==== The origin of the sun and moon ====
The cave of Iguanaboina was the primordial den from which the Sun emerges to illuminate the earth and to which it returns to hide as the moon emerges. In the book “An Account of the Antiquities of the Indians,” Arrom provides his account of Friar Ramon Pané’s discussion of Boinayel:

They also say that the Sun and the Moon emerged from a cave called Iguanaboina, located in the country of a cacique [chief] named Mautiatihuel, and they hold it in great esteem and have it painted in their fashion, without any figures, with a lot of foliage and other such things. And in the said cave there were two zemis [cemis] made from stone, small ones, the size of half an arm, with their hands tied, and they seemed to be sweating. The Taíno valued those zemis very highly; and when it did not rain, they say that they would go in there to visit them, and it would rain at once. And one zemi they called Boinayel and the other Márohu.

==== The origins of life and the ocean, or bagua ====
The birth of the ocean and the life within it is the first act of creation of the Taíno universe. The tale is told in two different but closely related myths from Hispaniola. The same myths have also been artistically encoded in a sequence of petroglyphs located in the central precinct of the famous ceremonial center of Caguana in Puerto Rico. The first myth speaks of the powerful creator god called Yaya, considered the supreme being of the universe. Considered the life-giving spirit and causal force of creation that presides over the universe, Yaya plays multiple functions in the mythology, as supreme being, cacique, and father. The myth recounts how Yaya's son Yayael was ostracized for wanting to kill his father and consequently banished; afterwards, upon Yayael’s return, his father killed him and placed his bones inside a gourd to hang from the roof of the house, where it remained for a time. One day wishing to see his son, Yaya requested his wife to take down the gourd and empty it to see the bones of his son. From the gourd, many large and small fish gushed out. Seeing that the bones were transformed into fish, they resolved to eat them.

The second myth recounts the story of the mischievous sons of Itiba Cahubaba, the ‘Great Bleeding Mother’ who died giving birth to her four sons. The first son, named Deminan Caracaracol led his unnamed brothers in misadventures of creation throughout the Caribbean primordial world. These mythic tricksters are known as civilizing heroes in the Taíno mythology. The myth begins with the hungry brothers entering Yaya's house to steal food; after they lowered the gourd where Yayael’s bones were placed and began eating fish, they heard Yaya returning, and while trying to hang the gourd back on the roof in haste, they dropped it and it broke. It is said that so much water came out of the gourd that it covered the earth and with it many fish poured out; and this is the ocean's origins.

==== The quadruplets ====
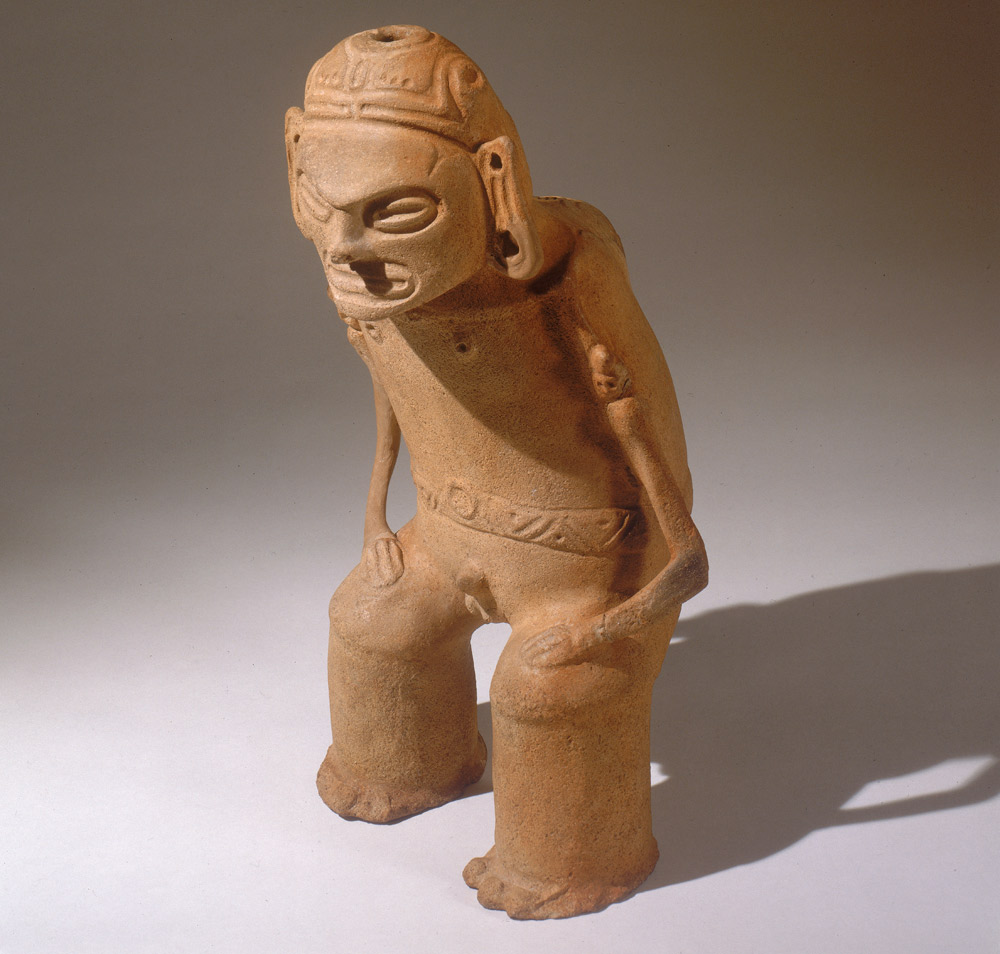
Taíno zemí of Deminán Caracaracol

Similar to Yayaels case, after stealing and breaking the gourd, the punishment was banishment from Yaya’s chiefdom/land. The brothers were condemned to live away from the domain presided by the supreme being. Unlike Yayael, who returns home in defiance of Yaya, the four brothers never tried to return. Because of their compliance with the norm of banishment, the acquisition of culture was possible. It was the banishment that caused these culture heroes to begin the long journey that leads to the discovery of the secrets of culture for the benefit of humankind, such as agriculture, fire, and entheogenic plants.

Taíno myths recount that it was first Deminan and his brothers who learned about fire for cooking, and how to plant and harvest in order to make their staple casabe bread. They were the ones who wrestled from the proverbial mythical wise old man Baymanaco, the rituals and secrets of shamanism, healing, and magic, such as the use of tobacco, digo, and cohoba. Robbing Bayamanaco established the casabe as a basic food in their diet; established the use of fire, which gives heat and light, and allows cooking; and established the knowledge of cohoba, a hallucinogenic plant that makes communication with the gods possible. The centerpiece of the religious ceremony crucial to the Taíno, cohoba is a plant (Anadenanthera peregrina) whose seeds, when crushed and mixed with an alkaline substance (like lime or ground burned shells), produce a powder that can be sniffed to induce hallucinogenic experiences—the effects of which have been discussed in depth by Gerardo Reichel-Dolmatoff (1971, 1975). It was therefore regarded by the Taíno as a sacred substance that permitted the ordinary person to transcend into the extraordinary world of the supernatural. The inhalation of powders from this plant was the most important religious and political ritual.

=== Creation myth historiography ===
Modern knowledge of Taíno creation myths comes from 16th century Spanish chroniclers investigating the Indigenous Caribbean culture. Columbus was very much interested in knowing about the religion of the Taínos; In his original letter to the Queen, he expressed the opinion that the Natives had no religion whatsoever, however this was an attempt to persuade Isabella that it would be easy to convert them to Christianity. Nevertheless, he ordered the Hieronymite Friar Ramon Pane who accompanied him on his second voyage, to study the religion of the Natives of northern Hispaniola; the friar, later acquiring the native language, produced the volume titled as Legends and Beliefs of the Indians of the Antilles. In this work, Ramon Pane recorded not only the Taínos’ religious beliefs but also some of their myths. Because these narratives have an artistic, literary quality, Pane’s work is also considered the beginning of literature in the Americas. Unfortunately, the original Spanish manuscript has been lost, with only the Italian version including its many errors of transliteration surviving to the present day.

Another significant primary source comes from Father Bartolome de Las Casas, who wrote many books about the Taíno, including Historia de las Indias; although it was never finished, it has proved a rich source with a great deal of information about the customs of the natives. Las Casas came to the island in 1502, first as a colonizer using Taíno labor and treating them the same as other Spanish colonizers; however, soon he came to hate how badly these native people were mistreated, and decided to dedicate his life to improving their condition. In his writings he described how many of the cultural practices that Europeans considered objectionable in the Taíno had also been common among the Europeans’ own ancestors; using examples from Greek and Roman mythology, he tried to demonstrate that the thinking of the Taíno were not so different from that of Europe’s early pagans.

== Folklore ==
=== Hupia ===
In Taíno culture, the hupia (also opia, opi'a, op'a, operi'to) is the spirit of a person who has died. Hupias were contrasted with goeiza, spirits of the living. While a living goieza had definite form, after passing away the spirit was released as a hupia and went to live in a remote earthly paradise called Coaybay. Hupias were believed to be able to assume many forms, sometimes appearing as faceless people or taking the form of a deceased loved one. Hupias in human form could always be distinguished by their lack of a navel. Hupias were also associated with bats and said to hide or sleep during the day and come out at night to eat guava fruit.

In the novel Jurassic Park by Michael Crichton, hupia are suspected of an attack on an 18-year-old boy working on construction for Jurassic Park on the fictional island of Isla Nublar, as well as a rash of attacks in rural Costa Rica. The culprits are later revealed as a Velociraptor, and a Procompsognathus that had escaped from Isla Nublar.

== Ritual practice ==
The Taíno believed they originated from a cave called Cacibajagua. As such, caves were important ritual sites, though there doesn't appear to be evidence of long-term inhabitation. The Taíno ball courts or bateyes were also important ritual and cultural sites both within and outside the context of sport. The Taíno believed that the exit from the originary cave preceded heroic sailing journeys with mystical elements, perhaps reflecting knowledge of the original settlement of the Caribbean island chain by canoe (for Arawaks, from the Orinoco, and for the Guanahatabey, from the Yucatán).

While alluvial gold was present in the Antilles, a highly-prized alloy of gold, silver, and copper called guanin had to be imported, since there was no smelting culture. Guanin had various connections to Taíno sacred aesthetics due to its luster, color, and smell, as well as coming from the mainland, causing it to be highly prized. Sacred stools or duhos, ceremonial emesis-inducers ('vomit sticks') and zemi depictions were laminated with guanin, for example. Guanin was also the name of a mythic island visited by Guahuyona, a hero of myth. The Taíno related to Columbus and Pané that a dark-skinned people from mainland South America brought them guanin: these people had guanin spear-tips. The material left a lasting impression on the Taíno, but they didn't adopt the material for weaponry.

An important ritual component of behikes, kasikes, and certain nobles or nitainos was the insufflation of hallucinogenic substances. The cohoba ritual was preceded by ritual purification with fasting, river bathing, and the use of sacred 'vomit sticks.' The practice involved a perception of lineage continuity back to the hallowed first priest, Loko (Louquo for mainland Arawaks). Knowledge was gained from ancestors and zemis in this practice, since the behike had to have a large and sophisticated arsenal to handle issues brought to him by clients. Immaterial connections to the mythic past could yield insight, for example, into a specific plant that might be needed for a given circumstance, or a specific technique in relation to a plant (the removal of cyanide from cassava by sluice, for example).

There was a realm of zemis, a realm of the living, and a realm of the dead called Coaibai. This tripartite division was reflected in the sculpting of trigonolite zemi amulets which could adorn the head, chest, or bicep. Dead souls or hupia could move between the living and dead realms, particularly at night. You could tell them apart from humans by their lack of belly button. The Taíno tended to walk in pairs or greater at night, since hupia only appeared to individuals.

The first creation myth of Yaya established funerary rites and the cult of the dead. Supported by the descriptions provided by Columbus himself during his visit of eastern Cuba, it was a Taíno custom of burning the deceased and selecting the skull and long bones to “bury” them inside a gourd or woven basket that is to be hung from the roof of the house. As many other Amerindians, the Taíno considered bones not simply as symbols for the dead, death, sterility, quite the contrary, they were the source of life itself, and as the myth recounts, Yayael’s dead bones had the power to create ordered life in the primordial world

== Historiography ==
The first European account of Taíno mythology was recorded by Friar Ramón Pané, in his Relación acerca de las antigüedades de los indios. The text is fairly disordered due to what it has undergone through history: Pané himself could only speak Macorix, another Indigenous language of Hispaniola, and had to work with a translator who could speak Macorix, Taíno, and basic Spanish. A kasike performed the material for the translator in ritual fashion, and since the translator was Macorix and couldn't grasp the subtleties of the presentation, this caused more distortion. Further, Pané's original text is lost, and modern versions work from a later Italian translation.

Taíno religion developed over time. Columbus encountered a situation where the Taíno culture of the Xaragua cacicazgo was the most elite, so their religion and values dominated in Hispaniola. But this wasn't always the case. Just as we can trace an evolution in Island Arawak pottery (shown in the work of Irving Rouse, Samuel Wilson, and others), we can expect a similar process in mythology and religion.

The duho or chief stool is one of the most sacred objects of elite Taíno culture. Interestingly, the word itself is not of Arawak origin. It comes from Warao duhu, meaning ‘sit, stool.’ Warao is a language isolate, and its speakers inhabit the Orinoco Delta region, from which Island Arawak speakers originally migrated to settle in the Caribbean. As such, we can consider Langberry & Vescelius (2004) who claim that this indicates a possible cultural exchange or point of contact between Warao and Island Arawak speakers, but not an extensive one since there are only a few Warao-origin words in Taíno. However, though not extensive, the interaction may have been significant, given the resulting ritual importance of the duho for Taíno people. This is one example of change in Taíno religion due to time and encounter.

Prominent Taíno deities include:

- Atabey
- Guabancex
- Yúcahu

Although not all of Taíno myths have been preserved in the Spanish accounts, themes pertaining to their mythology are also symbolically encoded in their ritual material culture, objects such as sculptures, rattle gourds, and petroglyphs; it has been therefore possible for anthropologists to reconstruct some of the lost elements of these myths. For example, modern investigators have compared Pane's descriptions of Taíno art with archeological discoveries and the myths and vocabulary of other present-day Arawakan groups. Thanks to these works, such as the research of José Juan Arrom, it has been possible to interpret the most important myths and Antillean divinities.

Post-Columbus developments like Haitian Vodou and Dominican Vudú (21 Divisions) reserve a place for zemis and mythic Taíno heroes in the 'Indian nation' or 'Indian division,' which include figures like the kasike and rebel queen against the Spaniards Anacaona and the first behike or houngan Loko.
