= Atabey (goddess) =

Zemi of the Taínos

- Great Mother; Primordial Creator and Primordial Waters
- Member of the Zemi
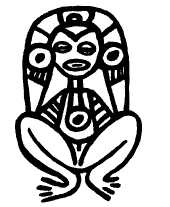
- Pretroglyph of Atabey
- Other names: Atabeira, Yermao, Apito, Siaco, Guacarapita
- Venerated in: The Greater Antilles; Taino religion
- Abode: The heavens
- Planet: Earth
- Symbol: Moon, Frog

Genealogy
- Children: Yúcahu

Equivalents
- Etruscan: Cel
- Greek: Gaia
- Hindu: Mahadevi
- Roman: Terra

Atabey is an ancestral mother of the Taíno, one of two supreme ancestral spirits in Taíno mythology. She is a goddess associated with the moon, fresh waters, fertility and creation; she is the female entity who represents the spirit of all horizontal water, lakes, streams, the sea, and the marine tides. This spirit was one of the most important for the Native tribes that inhabited the Caribbean islands of the Antilles, mostly in Puerto Rico, Dominican Republic, Cuba and Haiti and is still worshipped by many neo-Taino communities in the Spanish West Indies.

Atabey or Atabeira defines prime matter and all that is tangible or material and has several manifestations. One is the aforementioned nurturing maternal figure. Another is Caguana, the spirit of love. The last is Guabancex (also known as Gua Ban Ceh), the violent, wild mother of storms, volcanoes, and earthquakes.

Alternate names for Atabey include Iermaoakar, Apito, and Sumaiko. Taíno women prayed to Atabey to ensure safe childbirth.

== Names ==
Early ethnohistorical sources indicate that Atabey was known under several names. In the Relación acerca de las antigüedades de los indios (c. 1498), written by the Jeronymite friar Ramón Pané and generally considered the earliest account of Taíno religious beliefs, the mother of the supreme being is said to have been known by five different names. The original manuscript of Pané’s report has not survived, and the passage is preserved only through later textual traditions transmitted by early sixteenth-century chroniclers, notably the Latin summary by Peter Martyr d’Anghiera, passages incorporated by Bartolomé de las Casas, and the Italian version published by Alfonso de Ulloa. Differences among these witnesses—such as Latinized spellings and the fusion or division of words—reflect the complex transmission history of the text. (Note: Pané’s original manuscript, written in Spanish in the late fifteenth century, has not survived. Modern knowledge of the text derives primarily from the Latin summary by Peter Martyr d’Anghiera and from the textual tradition associated with the Historia del Almirante, attributed to Ferdinand Columbus and transmitted in Italian by Alfonso de Ulloa.)

The historiography of Taíno religion has offered several interpretations of these names and their meanings. José Juan Arrom interpreted the theonym Atabey as referring to a primordial maternal principle often associated with freshwater and fertility in Taíno cosmology. Other studies in Caribbean ethnohistory have emphasized its meaning as a revered or ancestral mother within the Indigenous religious system.

Scholars have also proposed different explanations for the discrepancies between the lists preserved in the Anglerian and Ulloan traditions. Some analyses attribute these variations to processes of textual transmission, including the Latinization of Indigenous names, orthographic fluctuation, and the accidental fusion of words in Renaissance copies. Other interpretations have defended the primacy of the tradition transmitted by Peter Martyr d’Anghiera and proposed etymological explanations for the names recorded in that version, interpreting them as symbolic epithets describing attributes of the deity.

== Mythology ==
Atabey conceived a child without intercourse. Yúcahu because he is the principal Taíno god who rules over the fertility of Yuca (cassava).

== In popular culture ==
Atabey's symbology (and her avatar Guabancex) is one of the fundamental thematic foundations of the historical thriller Los hijos de la Diosa Huracán, by Daína Chaviano (Grijalbo-Random House, 2019). In this novel, this deity is a key character and subject in developing and solving the mysteries of the plot.

Atabey, Guabancex with her helpers Guatabá, Cuastriquie, and Juracán (embodiment of the hurricane) are repeatedly evoked in a novel by the Cuban-american writer Frederick A. de Armas. In Sinfonía salvaje (Madrid: Verbum, 2019) the hurricane represents the changes brought about in 1959 by the Cuban Revolution.

Apito (an alternative name for Atabey) is a thematic deity in the fictional series Dungeon Crawler Carl. In the series Apito rules over the other gods along with her consort Taranis. She is also called the Oak Mother and is the caretaker for the All Tree.
