= Taíno =

Indigenous people of the Caribbean

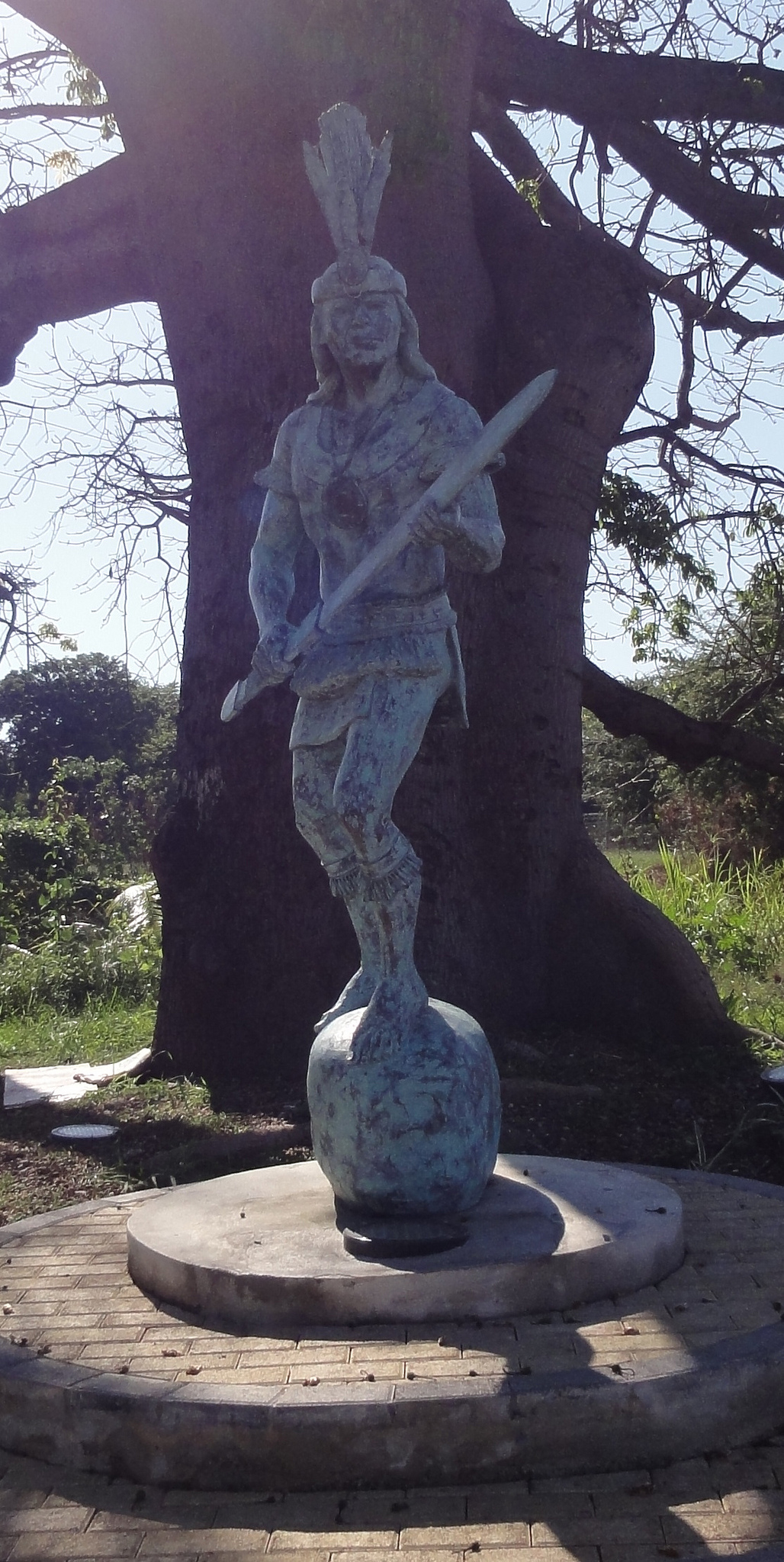
- Statue of Agüeybaná II, "El Bravo" in Ponce, Puerto Rico

Regions with significant populations
- Cuba, Dominican Republic, Haiti, Jamaica, Puerto Rico, Bahamas

Languages
- English, Spanish, French, Dutch, Creole languages Taíno (historically)

Religion
- Taíno (historically)

Related ethnic groups
- Lokono, Kalinago, Garifuna, Igneri, Guanahatabey, Arawak

The Taíno were the Indigenous peoples in most of the West Indies, in the Caribbean region of the Americas. Their culture has been continued today by their descendants and by Taíno revivalist communities. They were the first New World peoples encountered by non-Norse Europeans. Part of the Arawak group of Indigenous peoples in the Americas, the Taíno are also referred to as Island Arawaks or Antillean Arawaks.

Extending from the Lucayan Archipelago through the Greater Antilles of Cuba, Jamaica, Hispaniola, and Puerto Rico to Guadeloupe in the northern Lesser Antilles, or the Leeward Islands, the Taíno historically lived in agricultural societies ruled by caciques with fixed settlements under a matrilineal system of kinship and inheritance, and a religion centered on the worship of zemis. At the time of European contact, they shared land with older Indigenous inhabitants, namely the Guanajatabeyes in Cuba, and the Ciguayos and the Macorix in Hispaniola, and they were engaged in conflict with the recent Carib settlers of the southern Lesser Antilles, or the Windward Islands.

The Taíno historically spoke an Arawakan language. Julian Granberry and Gary Vescelius (2004) recognise two varieties of the Taino language: "Classical Taino", spoken in Puerto Rico and most of Hispaniola, and "Ciboney Taino", spoken in the Bahamas, most of Cuba, western Hispaniola, and Jamaica. These Indigenous peoples did not refer to themselves originally as Taíno; the term was first explicitly used in this sense by Constantine Samuel Rafinesque in 1836.

Historically, anthropologists and historians asserted that the Taíno were no longer extant centuries ago, or that they gradually merged into a common identity with African and Hispanic cultures. Scholarly attitudes to Taíno survival and resurgence began to change around the 21st century. Many people today identify as Taíno, and many more have Taíno descent, most notably in Puerto Rico, Cuba, and the Dominican Republic. A substantial number of Puerto Ricans, Cubans, and Dominicans have Indigenous mitochondrial DNA, which may suggest Taíno descent through the direct female line, especially in Puerto Rico. While some communities describe an unbroken cultural heritage passed down through the generations, often in secret, others are revivalist communities who seek to incorporate Taíno culture into their lives.

== Terminology ==
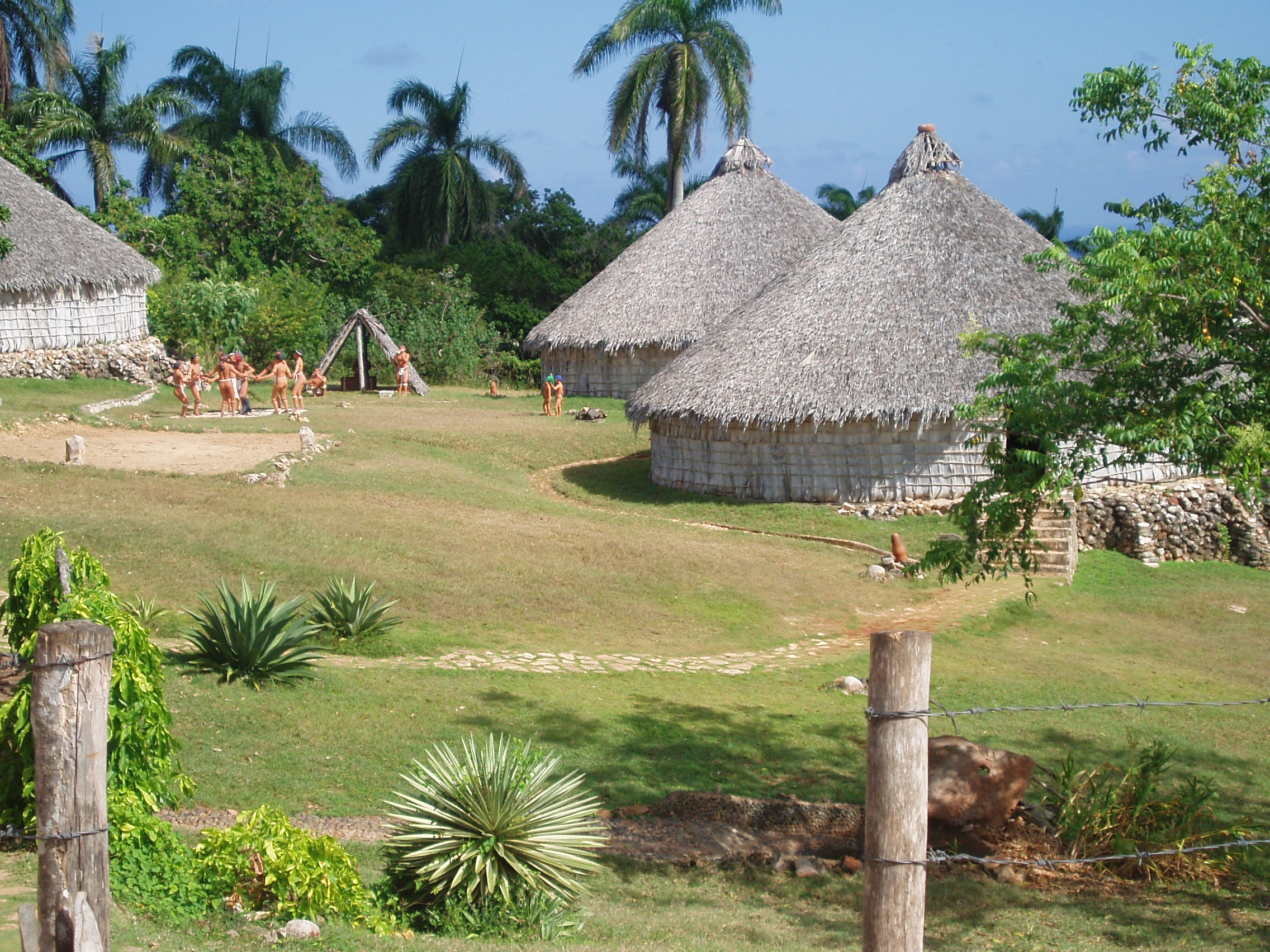
Reconstruction of a Taíno village in El Chorro de Maíta, Cuba

Taíno is not a universally accepted denomination—it was not the name the Indigenous peoples of the Greater Antilles called themselves historically, and there is uncertainty about the attributes and territorial boundaries of the Taíno among scholars who use the term. Historians disagree whether the peoples now referred to as Taíno were a singular group or multiple, distinct groups. The islanders that Christopher Columbus encountered either did not have a self-designation or Columbus did not record it, simply referring to them as "Indians". The peoples who inhabited most of the Greater Antilles when Europeans arrived were first called Taínos by Constantine Samuel Rafinesque in 1836. In his Historia de las Indias, Bartolomé de las Casas uses specific terms like "Lucayos" and "cibonéyes" to refer to Indigenous peoples and languages in the Bahamas and Cuba. In Hispaniola, Las Casas notes at least 3 languages including Lower Macorix, Upper Macorix, and a lingua franca understood across the island whose main dialect was Xaraguá.

In 1871, early ethnohistorian Daniel Garrison Brinton referred to the Taíno people as the Island Arawak, because of their connections with the Lokono (Arawaks) of the mainland and because the Taíno language was part of the Arawakan language family. Scholars and writers continued to refer to the Indigenous group as Arawaks, Island Arawaks, or Antillean Arawaks until the 1990s. According to Brinton, the lingua franca spoken in Hispaniola had been the subject of "strange and wild theorizing among would-be philologists" and that it was Rafinesque who "christened it the "Taino" language".

Contemporary scholars such as Irving Rouse and Basil Reid have concluded the Taíno developed a distinct language and culture from the Lokono of South America. As such, many modern historians, linguists, and anthropologists now use the term Taíno to refer to all the formerly Island Arawak nations except the Kalinago (Island Caribs), who are not seen as belonging to the same people. Rouse classifies all inhabitants of the Greater Antilles as Taíno (except those from the western tip of Cuba and small pockets of Hispaniola), as well as those of the Lucayan Archipelago and the northern Lesser Antilles. Modern groups with Caribbean-Indigenous heritage have also reclaimed the exonym Taíno as a self-descriptor, although terms such as Neo-Taino or Indio are also used.

Rouse also subdivides the historic Taíno into three main groups:

- Classic Taíno in most of Hispaniola and all of Puerto Rico.
- Western Taíno, or sub-Taíno in Hispaniola, most of Cuba, Jamaica, and the Lucayan archipelago.
- Eastern Taíno in the northern Lesser Antilles from the Virgin Islands to Guadeloupe.

Basil has also written that there is controversy about whether or not the Indigenous peoples of the Greater Antilles referred to themselves as Taíno, noting the existence of substantial cultural and linguistic differences between groups labelled as Taíno. Basil considers a unified notion of a "simple Arawak culture" to be overemphasized and states that while "the jury is still out" on whether Taíno is a historically accurate term, it will continue to be used by archaeologists "until they find a better alternative". The archaeologist José Oliver also writes that terms like Taíno and Carib are "problematic conceptual and definitional categories", use of which "disguises and misrepresents a diversity of identities and practices" among Indigenous peoples of the Greater Antilles. Oliver continues to use the term for convenience, despite its "problematic conceptual baggage".

The archaeologist L. Antonio Curet notes that "Despite its widespread use in academic and popular publications, the use of the term Taíno has not gone without criticism or opposition" and that academics since at least 1897 have been "criticizing its use and questioning its scientific basis and value and suggested using instead names such as siboneyes, haytianos, jamaiquinos, and borinqueños that were more related to actual terms used by the natives to refer to the islands," largely "because it has no true anthropological or historical meaning and it tends to homogenize a large number of groups with different identities." Gabriel de la Luz-Rodríguez, a professor at the University of Puerto Rico, argues that what he calls "the invention of the Taíno" was an aspect of "colonial rhetoric" emerging from early modern European writers. According to Luz-Rodríguez, the scholar Adriana Lewis-Galanes also considered Taíno a concept "invented by Europeans in order to refer to a diverse constellation" of Indigenous peoples in the Greater Antilles. Emily C. Kracht, Lindsay C. Bloch, and William F. Keegan of the Florida Museum of Natural History have written that they "avoid the term “Taíno” in describing peoples from the Caribbean as it is an umbrella term for the various cultural groups living there, though it does reflect the political and social ties between these groups over hundreds of years."

The researcher Jorge Estevez has written that the term Taíno is "highly controversial" and that while some "maintain that “Taíno” is indeed the tribal name of the most dominant Indigenous group of the Caribbean", he considers this claim "difficult to back up, since the people we call Taíno today were not one ethnic group, but rather composites of many different Indigenous, Arawakan-speaking peoples" who had mixed across geography and time in the Caribbean. However, Estevez believes the "modern name Taíno and its historical variants, “nitayno” or “tayno,” were the words the Indigenous peoples of the region used to identify themselves Caribbean-wide and are, indeed, applicable".

=== Etymology ===
Taíno derives from the term nitaino or nitayno, which referred to an elite social class, not an ethnic group. According to José Barreiro, the word Taíno directly translates as "men of the good". 16th-century Spanish documents do not use the word to refer to the tribal affiliation or ethnicity of the Natives of the Greater Antilles; the word tayno or taíno, with the meaning "good" or "prudent", was mentioned twice in an account of Christopher Columbus's second voyage by his physician, Diego Álvarez Chanca, while in Guadeloupe. José R. Oliver writes that the Natives of Borinquén, who had been captured by the Caribs of Guadeloupe and who wanted to escape on Spanish ships to return home to Puerto Rico, used the term to indicate that they were the "good men", as opposed to the Caribs.

According to Peter Hulme, the word taíno was probably used by Columbus's sailors, not by the islanders who greeted them. The sailors may have been saying the only word they knew in a Native Caribbean tongue, or were perhaps indicating to the "commoners" on the shore that they were taíno—i.e., important people from elsewhere and thus entitled to deference. If taíno was being used to denote ethnicity, then the Spanish sailors were using it to indicate they were "not Carib" themselves.

== Origins ==
The Guanahatabey region in relation to Taíno and Island Carib groups

Taíno culture as documented is believed to have developed in the Caribbean. The Taíno creation story says they emerged from caves in a sacred mountain on present-day Hispaniola. Scholars have developed two theories to explain the origin of the Indigenous Caribbean people:

- One group of scholars contends that the Taíno's ancestors were Arawak speakers from the centre of the Amazon Basin, as indicated by linguistic, cultural, and ceramic evidence. They migrated to the Orinoco Valley on the north coast, before reaching the Caribbean by way of what is now Venezuela into Trinidad, migrating along the Lesser Antilles to Cuba and The Bahamas. Evidence that supports the theory includes the tracing of the ancestral cultures of these people to the Orinoco Valley and their languages to the Amazon Basin.
- The alternate theory, known as the circum-Caribbean theory, contends that the Taíno's ancestors diffused from the Colombian Andes. Julian H. Steward, who originated this concept, suggests a migration from the Andes to the Caribbean and a parallel migration into Central America and the Guianas, Venezuela, and the Amazon Basin of South America.

DNA studies have suggested that the historic Taíno descended from "a wave of pottery-making farmers" known as the Ceramic Age people, who entered the Caribbean from the northeastern coast of South America 2,500 years ago. There they encountered the earlier Archaic Age people who had arrived "some 6,000 or 7,000 years ago" from Central and South America. Ancestry studies suggest the Taíno and these earlier Indigenous populations did not often intermarry—supporting earlier theories that the Ceramic Age people supplanted the Archaic Age people—but newer evidence suggests Archaic Age people may have survived until around 900CE in western Cuba.

In Puerto Rico, 21st-century studies indicate that a high proportion of people have Amerindian mtDNA, likely as a result of intermarriage during the early part of European colonisation. A small group of Taíno may also have survived in the mountains at Indiera Alta. DNA analysis suggests Puerto Ricans' Indigenous ancestry may derive from both the Ceramic Age people and the earlier Archaic Age people. The authors conclude that "a strong non-Amazonian contribution to the Taíno gene pool cannot be discarded from the data". Archaeological evidence, particularly pottery, also suggests that Taíno groups in Puerto Rico and Hispaniola may have had both Ceramic and Archaic origins.

== Society ==
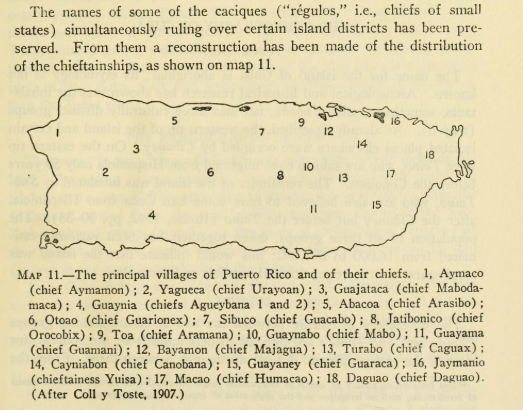
Cayetano Coll y Toste's 1901 map of Puerto Rico caciques

The Taíno founded settlements around villages and organised their chiefdoms, or cacicazgos, into a confederation. Individuals and kinship groups that previously had some prestige and rank in the tribe began to occupy the hierarchical position that would give way to the cacicazgo.

The Taíno society, as described by the Spanish chroniclers, was composed of four social classes: the cacique, the nitaínos, the bohíques, and the naborias. According to archaeological evidence, the Taíno islands were able to support a high number of people for approximately 1,500 years. Every individual living in the Taíno society had a task to do. Either people were hunting, searching for food, or doing other productive tasks. They followed a very efficient nature harvesting and agricultural production system. The Taíno believed that everyone living on their islands should eat properly.

Tribal groups settled in villages under a chieftain, known as cacique, or cacica if the ruler was a woman. Chiefs were chosen from the nitaínos and generally obtained power from belonging to a particular maternal line. (This was a matrilineal kinship system, with social status passed through the female lines.) The nitaínos functioned as sub-caciques in villages, overseeing the work of naborias. A male ruler was more likely to be succeeded by his sister's children than his own unless their mother's lineage allowed them to succeed in their own right. Spanish accounts of the rules of succession for a chief are not consistent, and the rules of succession may have changed as a result of the disruptions to Taíno society that followed the Spanish intrusion. Two early chroniclers, Bartolomé de las Casas and Peter Martyr d'Anghiera, reported that a chief was succeeded by a son of a sister. Las Casas was not specific as to which son of a sister would succeed, but d'Anghiera stated that the order of succession was the oldest son of the oldest sister, then the oldest son of the next oldest sister. Post-marital residence was avunculocal, meaning a newly married couple lived in the household of the maternal uncle. He was more important in the lives of his niece's children than their biological father; the uncle introduced the boys to men's societies in his sister and his family's clan.

The chiefs had both temporal and spiritual functions. Caciques were expected to ensure the welfare of the tribe and to protect it from harm from both natural and supernatural forces. They were also expected to direct and manage the food production process. The cacique's power came from the number of villages he controlled and was based on a network of alliances related to family, matrimonial, and ceremonial ties. According to an early 20th-century Smithsonian study, these alliances showed the unity of the Indigenous communities in a territory; they would band together as a defensive strategy to face external threats, such as the attacks by the Caribs on communities in Puerto Rico.

The practice of polygamy enabled the cacique to have women and create family alliances in different localities, thus extending his power. Ramón Pané, a Catholic friar who travelled with Columbus on his second voyage and was tasked with learning the Indigenous people's language and customs, wrote in the 16th century that caciques tended to have two or three spouses and the principal ones had as many as 10, 15, or 20.

As a symbol of his status, the cacique carried a guanín of South American origin, made of an alloy of gold and copper. This symbolised the first Taíno mythical cacique Anacacuya, whose name means "star of the center", or "central spirit". In addition to the guanín, the cacique used other artifacts and adornments to serve to identify his role. Some examples are tunics of cotton and rare feathers, crowns, and masks or "guaizas" of cotton with feathers; coloured stones, shells, or gold; cotton woven belts; and necklaces of snail beads or stones, with small masks of gold or other material. Caciques sat on wooden stools to be above the guests they received.

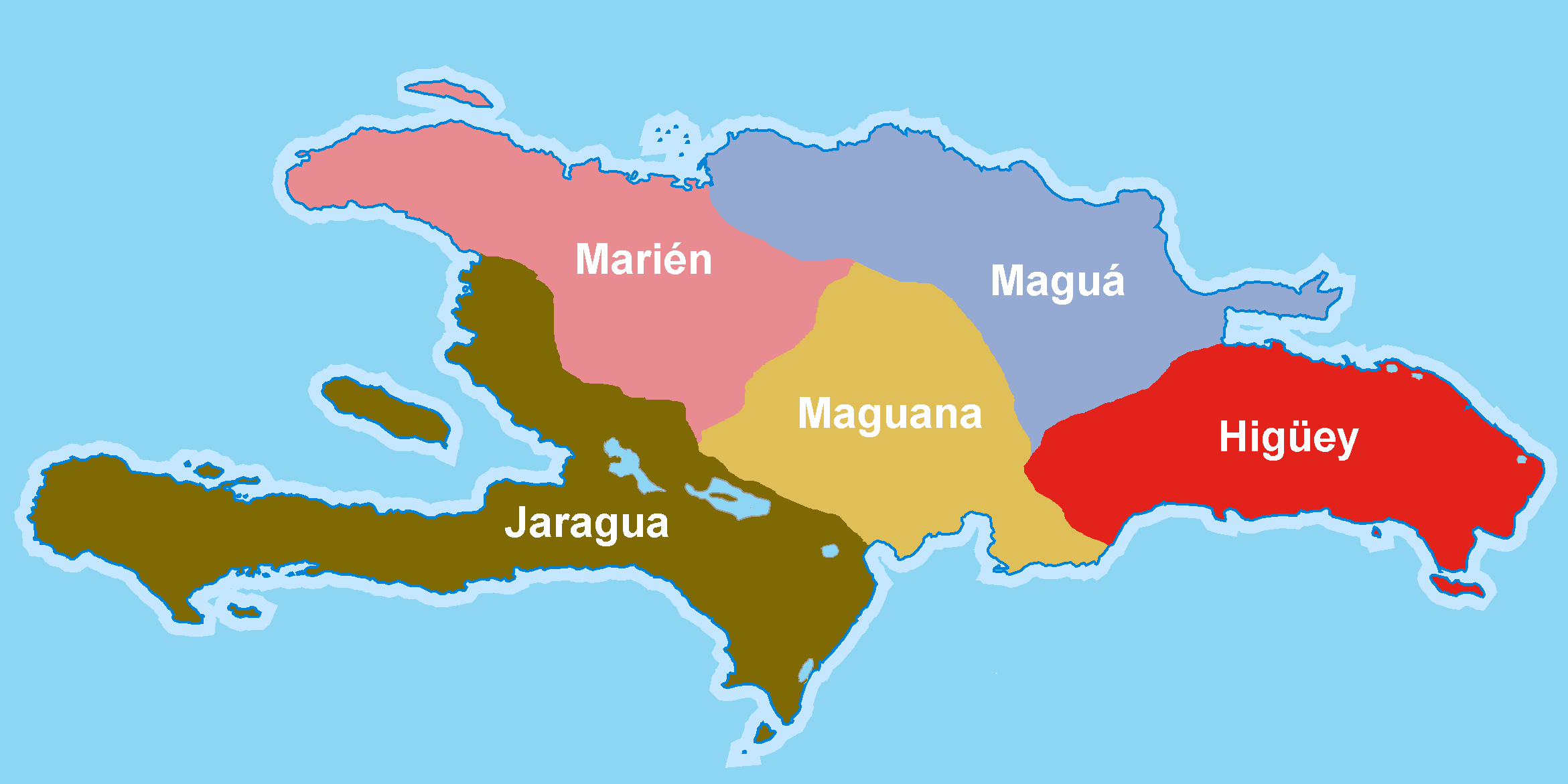
Cacicazgos of Hispaniola

Under the cacique, social organisation was composed of two tiers: The nitaínos at the top and the naborias at the bottom. The nitaínos were considered the nobles of the tribes. They were made up of warriors and the family of the cacique. Advisors who assisted in operational matters such as assigning and supervising communal work, planting and harvesting crops, and keeping peace among the village's inhabitants, were selected from among the nitaínos. The naborias were the more numerous working peasants of the lower class.

The bohíques were priests who represented religious beliefs and advised the caciques. Bohíques dealt with negotiating with angry or indifferent gods as the accepted lords of the spiritual world. The bohíques were expected to communicate with the gods, soothe them when they were angry, and intercede on the tribe's behalf. It was their duty to cure the sick, heal the wounded, and interpret the will of the gods in ways that would satisfy the expectations of the tribe. Before carrying out these functions, the bohíques performed certain cleansing and purifying rituals, such as fasting for several days and inhaling sacred tobacco snuff.

=== Women ===
Cacique (Chief) Taína, Indigenous of the island of Hispaniola

Women lived in village groups containing their children, and men lived separately. As a result, Taíno women had extensive control over their lives and their fellow villagers. The Taínos told Columbus that another Indigenous tribe, Caribs, were fierce warriors who made frequent raids on the Taínos, often capturing the women.

Taíno women played an important role in intercultural interaction between Spaniards and the Taíno people. When Taíno men were away fighting against intervention from other groups, women assumed the roles of primary food producers or ritual specialists. Women appeared to have participated in all levels of the Taíno political hierarchy, occupying roles as high up as cazica. Potentially, this meant Taíno women could make important choices for the village and could assign tasks to tribe members. There is evidence that suggests that the women who were the wealthiest among the tribe collected crafted goods that they would then use for trade or as gifts.

In contrast to the significant autonomy granted to women in Taíno society, Taíno women were taken by Spaniards as hostages to be used during negotiations. Some sources report that Taíno women became so-called commodities for Spaniards to trade, seen by some as the beginning of a period of more regular Spanish abduction and systemic rape of Taíno women.

== Culture ==
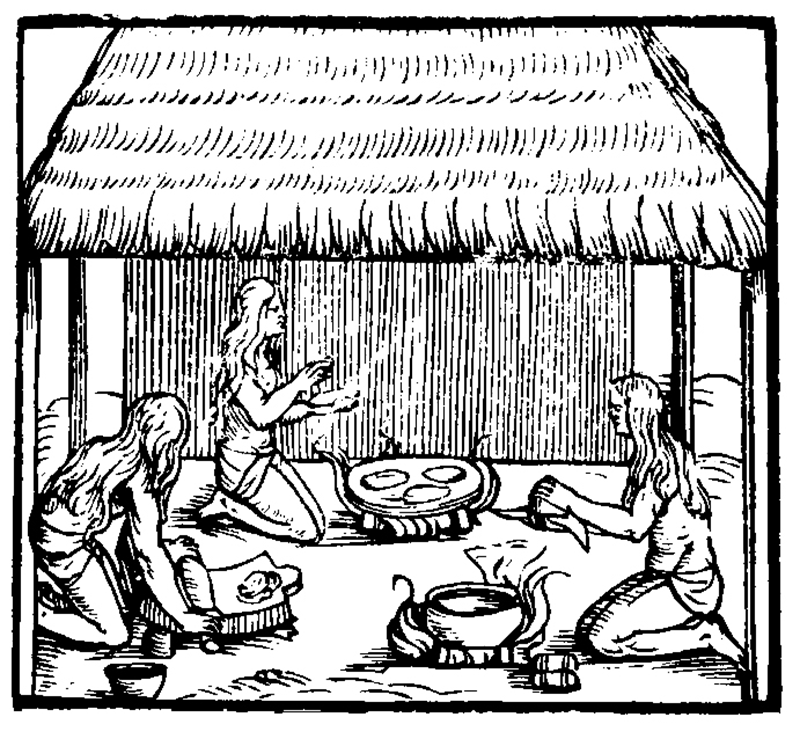
Some Taíno women are preparing cassava bread in 1565: grating yuca roots into paste, shaping the bread, and cooking it on a fire-heated burén

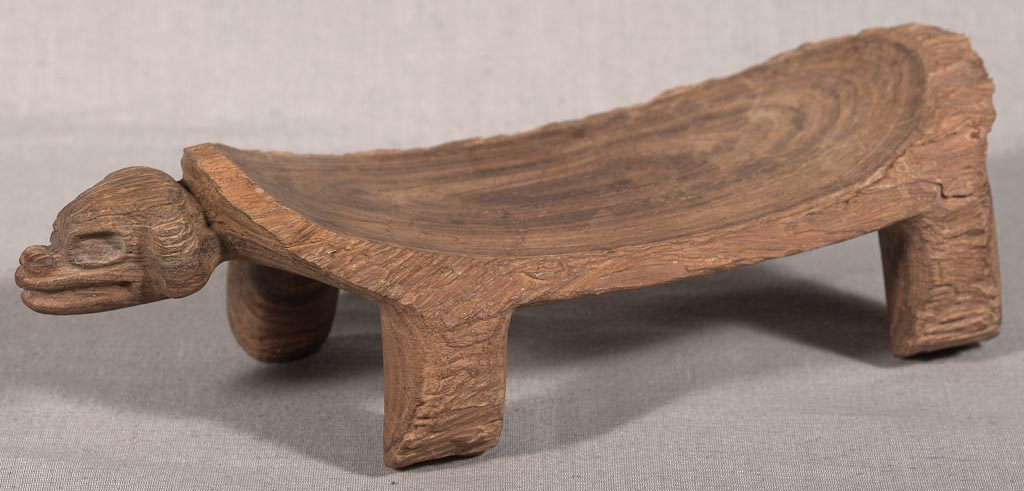
Dujo, a wooden ceremonial chair crafted by Taínos

Taíno women commonly wore their hair with bangs in front and longer in the back, and they occasionally wore gold jewellery, paint, and/or shells. Taíno men and unmarried women usually went naked. After marriage, women wore a small cotton apron, called a nagua.

The Taíno women were skilled in agriculture, which the people depended on. The men also fished and hunted, making fishing nets and ropes from cotton and palm. Their dugout canoes (kanoa) were of various sizes and could hold from 2 to 150 people; an average-sized canoe would hold 15–20. They used bows and arrows for hunting and developed the use of poisons on their arrowheads.

The Taíno lived in settlements called yucayeques, which varied in size depending on the location. Those in Puerto Rico and Hispaniola were the largest, and those in the Bahamas were the smallest. In the centre of a typical village was a central plaza, used for various social activities, such as games, festivals, religious rituals, and public ceremonies. These plazas had many shapes, including oval, rectangular, narrow, and elongated. Ceremonies where the deeds of the ancestors were celebrated, called areitos, were performed here.

Often, the general population lived in large circular buildings (bohios), constructed with wooden poles, woven straw, and palm leaves. These houses, built surrounding the central plaza, could hold 10–15 families each. The cacique and their family lived in rectangular buildings (caney) of similar construction, with wooden porches. Taíno home furnishings included cotton hammocks (hamaca), sleeping and sitting mats made of palms, wooden chairs (dujo or duho) with woven seats and platforms, and cradles for children.

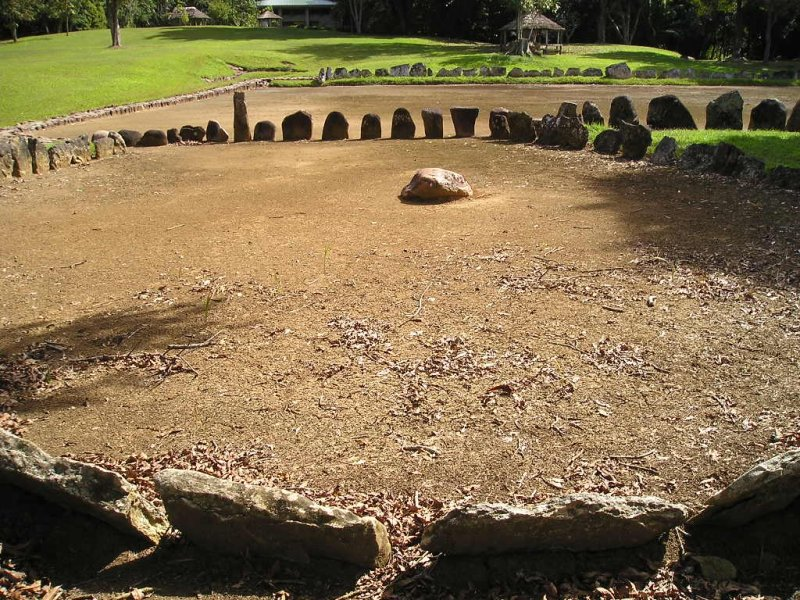
Caguana ceremonial ball court (batey) in Puerto Rico, outlined with stones

The Taíno played a ceremonial ball game called batey. There were 10 to 30 players per team, and a solid rubber ball was used. Normally, the teams were composed of men, but occasionally women played the game as well. The Classic Taíno played in the village's centre plaza or on especially designed rectangular ball courts called batey. Games on the batey are believed to have been used for conflict resolution between communities. The most elaborate ball courts are found at chiefdom boundaries. Often, chiefs made wagers on the possible outcome of a game.

Taíno spoke an Arawakan language and used an early form of proto-writing in the form of petroglyph, as found in Taíno archaeological sites in the West Indies. Some words they used, such as barbacoa ("barbecue"), hamaca ("hammock"), kanoa ("canoe"), tabaco ("tobacco"), sabana (savanna), and juracán ("hurricane"), have been incorporated into other languages.

For warfare, the men made wooden war clubs, which they called macanas. It was about one inch thick and was similar to the coco macaque. The Taínos decorated and applied war paint to their face to appear fierce toward their enemies. They ingested substances at religious ceremonies and invoked zemis.

== Food and agriculture ==
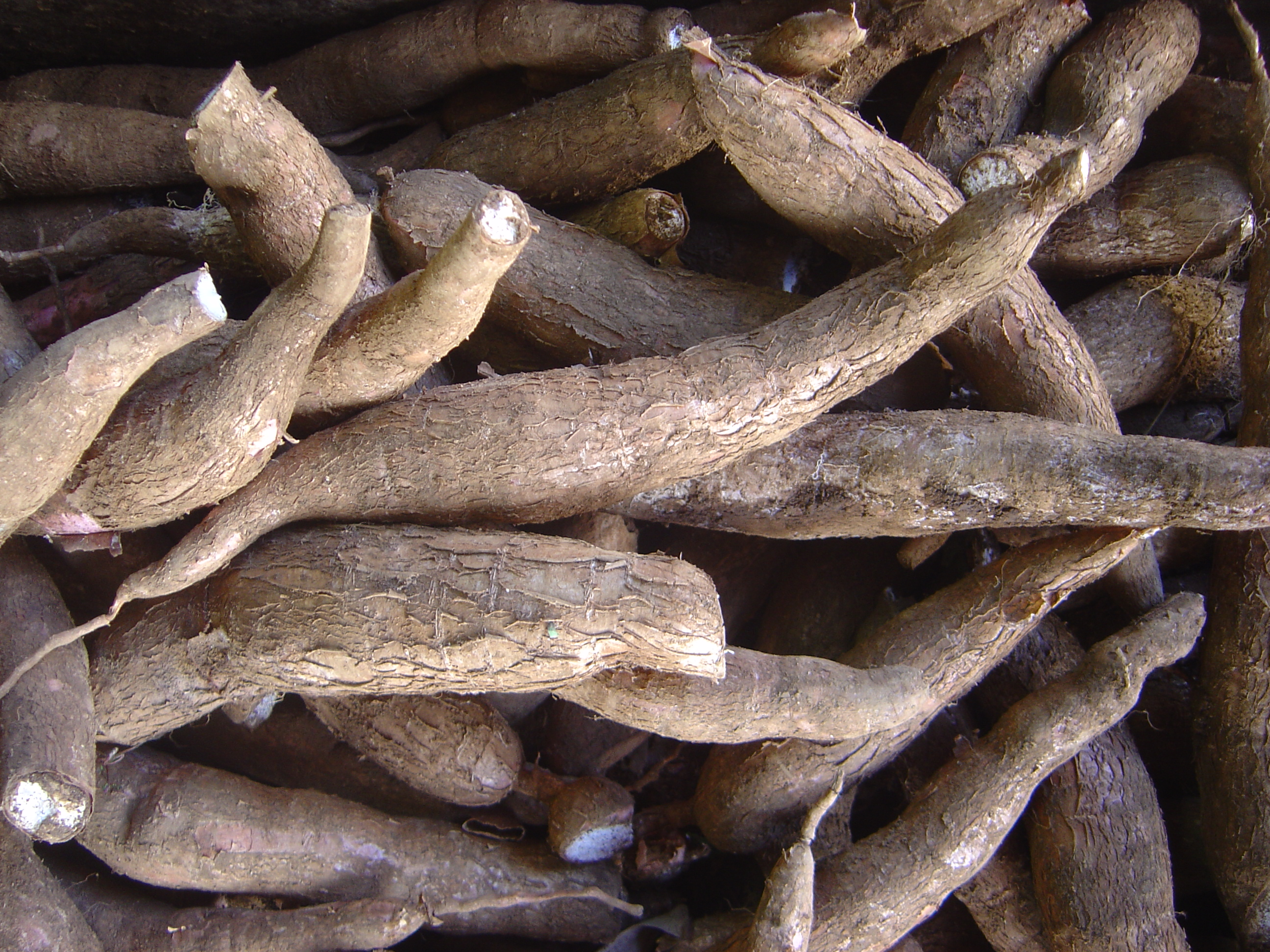
Cassava, starchy (yuca) roots, the Taínos' main crop

Taíno staples included vegetables, fruit, meat, and fish. Though there were no large animals native to the Caribbean, they captured and ate small animals such as hutias, other mammals, earthworms, lizards, turtles, and birds. Manatees were speared and fish were caught in nets, speared, trapped in weirs, or caught with hook and line. Wild parrots were decoyed with domesticated birds, and iguanas were taken from trees and other vegetation. The Taíno stored live animals until they were ready to be consumed: fish and turtles were stored in weirs, hutias and dogs were stored in corrals.

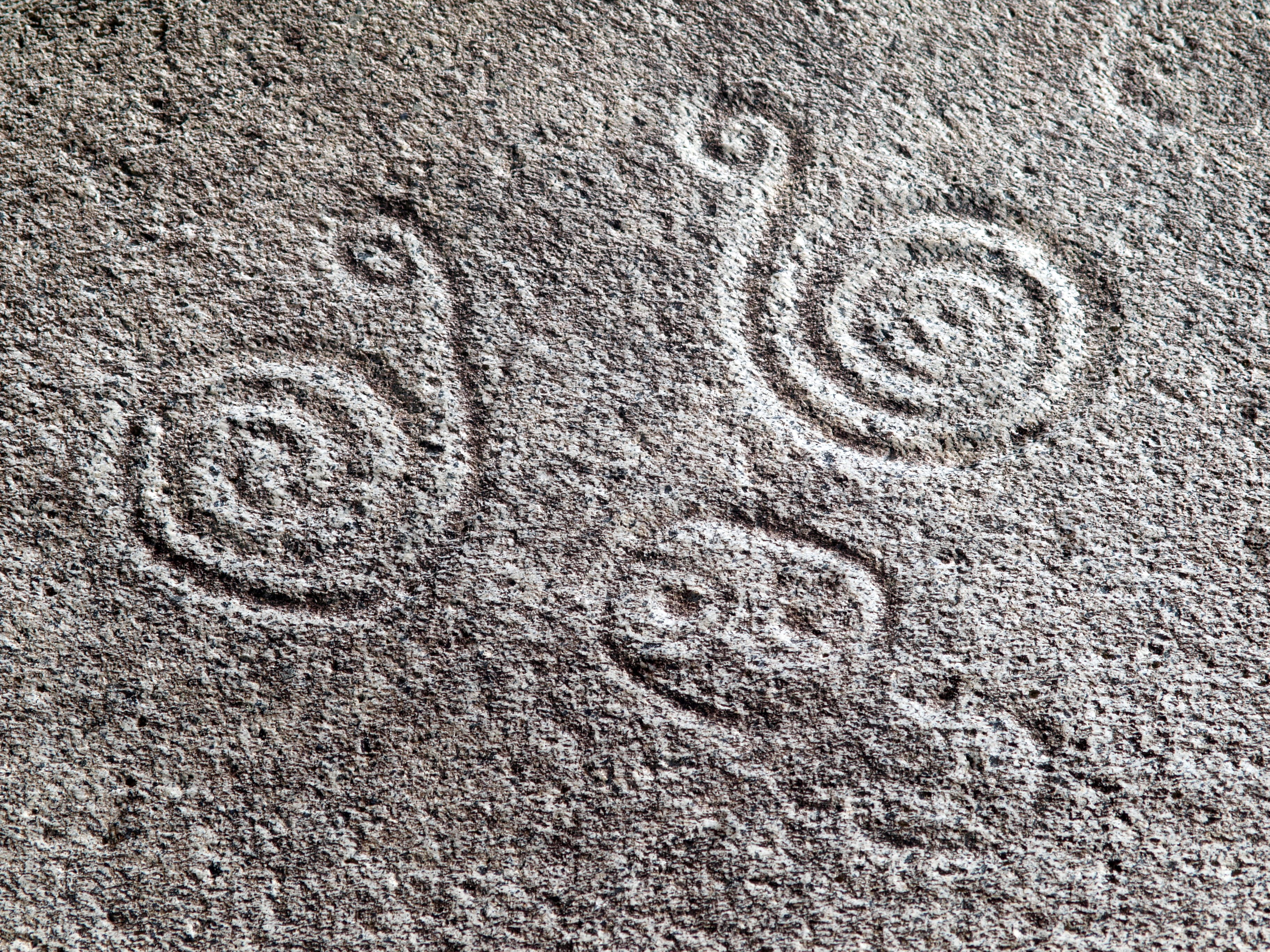
Piedra Escrita on River Saliente in Jayuya, Puerto Rico

The Taíno people became very skilled fishermen. One method used was to hook a remora to a line secured to a canoe and wait for the fish to attach itself to a larger fish or even a sea turtle. Once this happened, someone would dive into the water to retrieve the catch. Another method involved shredding the stems and roots of poisonous senna plants and throwing them into a stream. After eating the bait, the fish would be stunned and ready for collection. These practices did not render fish inedible. The Taíno also collected mussels and oysters in exposed mangrove roots found in shallow waters. Young boys hunted waterfowl from flocks that "darkened the sun", according to Columbus.

=== Food crops ===
Taíno groups located on islands that had experienced relatively high development, such as Puerto Rico, Hispaniola, and Jamaica, relied more on agriculture (farming and other jobs) than did groups living elsewhere. Fields for important root crops, such as the staple crop yuca, were prepared by heaping up mounds of soil, called conucos. This improved soil drainage and fertility as well as delayed erosion while allowing for the longer storage of crops in the ground. Typically, conucos were three feet high, nine feet in circumference, and were arranged in rows. Yuca was planted using a coa, a kind of hoe made completely from wood. Women processed the poisonous variety of cassava by squeezing it to extract its toxic juices. Roots were then ground into flour for bread. Batata (sweet potato) was the next most important root crop.

Other crops such as maize were cultivated in clearings made using the slash-and-burn technique. Contrary to mainland practices, maize was not ground into flour and baked into bread but was cooked and eaten off the cob. Corn bread becomes mouldy faster than cassava bread in the high humidity of the Caribbean. Corn also was used to make an alcoholic beverage known as chicha. The Taíno grew squash, beans, peppers, peanuts, and pineapples. Tobacco, calabashes (bottle gourds), and cotton were grown around the houses. Other fruits and vegetables, such as palm nuts, guavas, and Zamia roots, were collected from the wild.

=== Tobacco ===
Tobacco was grown for centuries before English contact. Columbus in his journal describes how Indigenous people used tobacco by lighting dried herbs wrapped in a leaf and inhaling the smoke. Tobacco, derived from the Taíno word "tabaco", was used in medicine and in religious rituals. The Taíno people utilised dried tobacco leaves, which they smoked using pipes and cigars. Alternatively, they finely crushed the leaves and inhaled them through a hollow tube. They employed uncomplicated yet efficient tools for planting and caring for their crops. Their primary tool was a planting stick, referred to as a coa, which measured around five feet in length and featured a sharp point that had been hardened through fire.

== Spirituality ==
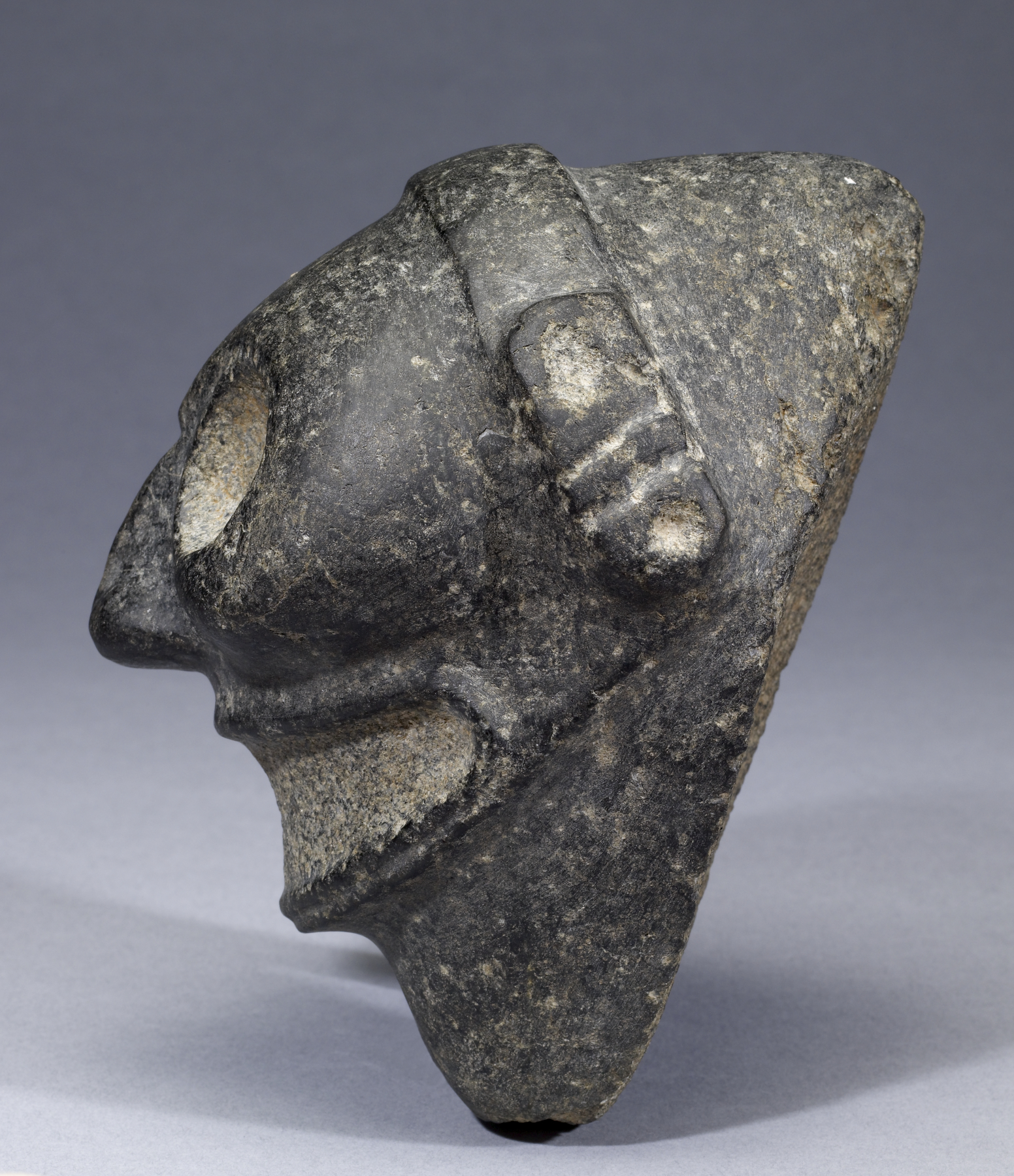
Taíno zemí sculpture Walters Art Museum

Spirituality centered on the worship of zemis (spirits or ancestors). Major Taíno zemis included Atabey and her son, Yúcahu. Atabey was thought to be the zemi of the moon, fresh waters, and fertility. Other names for her included Atabei, Atabeyra, Atabex, and Guimazoa. The Taínos of Hispaniola called her son, "Yúcahu|Yucahú Bagua Maorocotí", which meant "White Yuca, great and powerful as the sea and the mountains". He was considered the spirit of cassava, the zemi of cassava and the sea.

Guabancex was the non-nurturing aspect of the zemi Atabey who was believed to have control over natural disasters. She is identified as the goddess of hurricanes or as the zemi of storms. Guabancex had twin sons: Guataubá, a messenger who created hurricane winds, and Coatrisquie, who created floodwaters.

Iguanaboína was the goddess of good weather. She also had twin sons: Boinayel, the messenger of rain, and Marohu, the spirit of clear skies.

Minor Taíno zemis are related to the growing of cassava, the process of life, creation, and death. Baibrama was a minor zemi worshipped for his assistance in growing cassava and curing people of its poisonous juice. Boinayel and his twin brother Márohu were the zemis of rain and fair weather, respectively.

Maquetaurie Guayaba or Maketaori Guayaba was the zemi of Coaybay or Coabey, the land of the dead. Opiyelguabirán', a dog-shaped zemi, watched over the dead. Deminán Caracaracol, a male cultural hero from whom the Taíno believed themselves to be descended, was worshipped as a zemí. Macocael was a cultural hero worshipped as a zemi, who had failed to guard the mountain from which human beings arose. He was punished by being turned into stone, or a bird, a frog, or a reptile, depending on the interpretation of the myth.

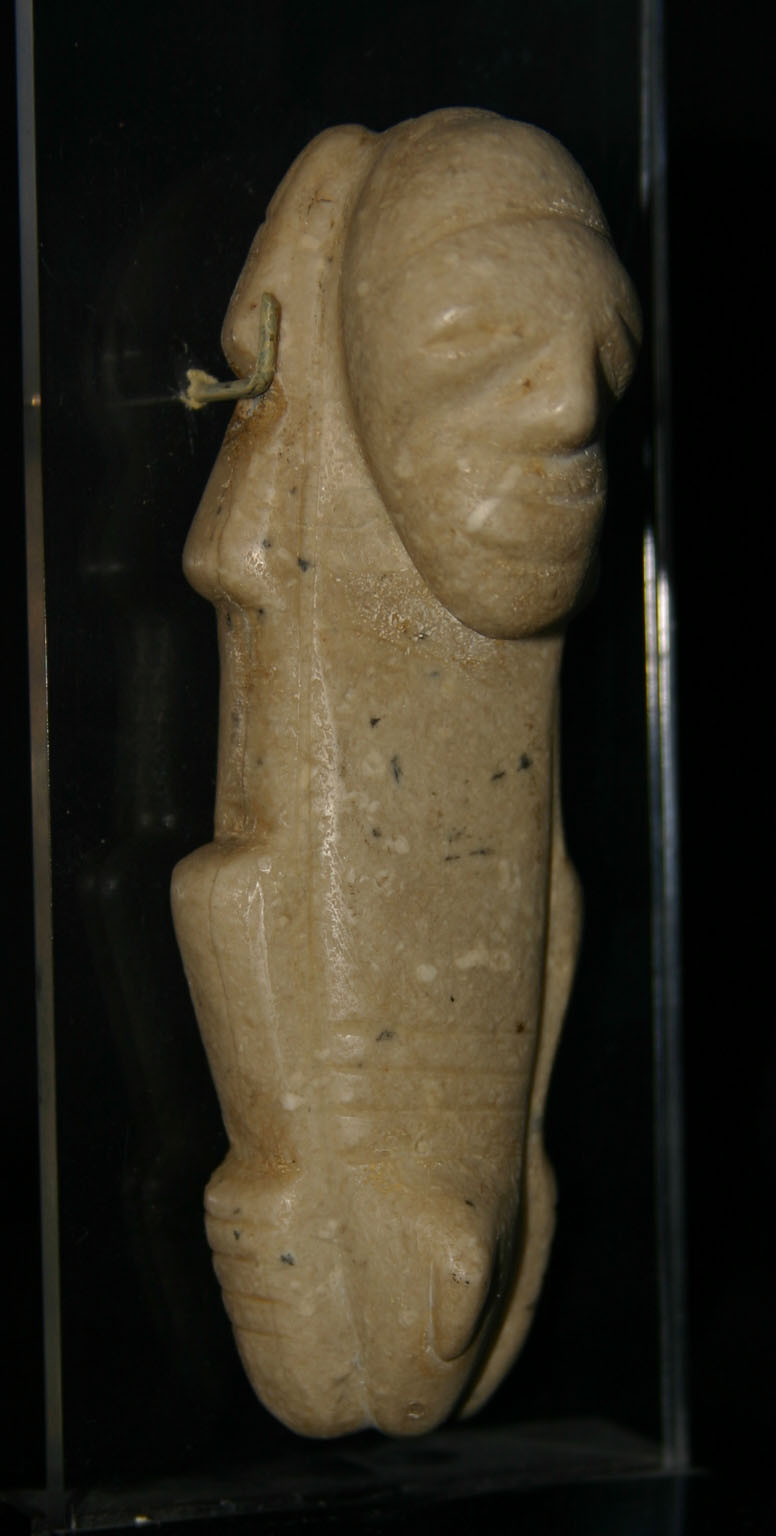
Zemí, a physical object housing a zemi, spirit or ancestor Lombards Museum

Zemí was also the name the people gave to physical representations of Zemis, which could be objects or drawings. They took many forms and were made of many materials and were found in a variety of settings. The majority of zemís were crafted from wood, but stone, bone, shell, pottery, and cotton were used as well. Zemí petroglyphs were carved on rocks in streams, ball courts, and stalagmites in caves, such as the zemi carved into a stalagmite in a cave in La Patana, Cuba. Cemí pictographs were found on secular objects such as pottery, and tattoos. Yucahú, the zemi of cassava, was represented with a three-pointed zemí, which could be found in conucos to increase the yield of cassava. Wood and stone zemís have been found in caves in Hispaniola and Jamaica. Cemís are sometimes represented by toads, turtles, fish, snakes, and various abstract and human-like faces.

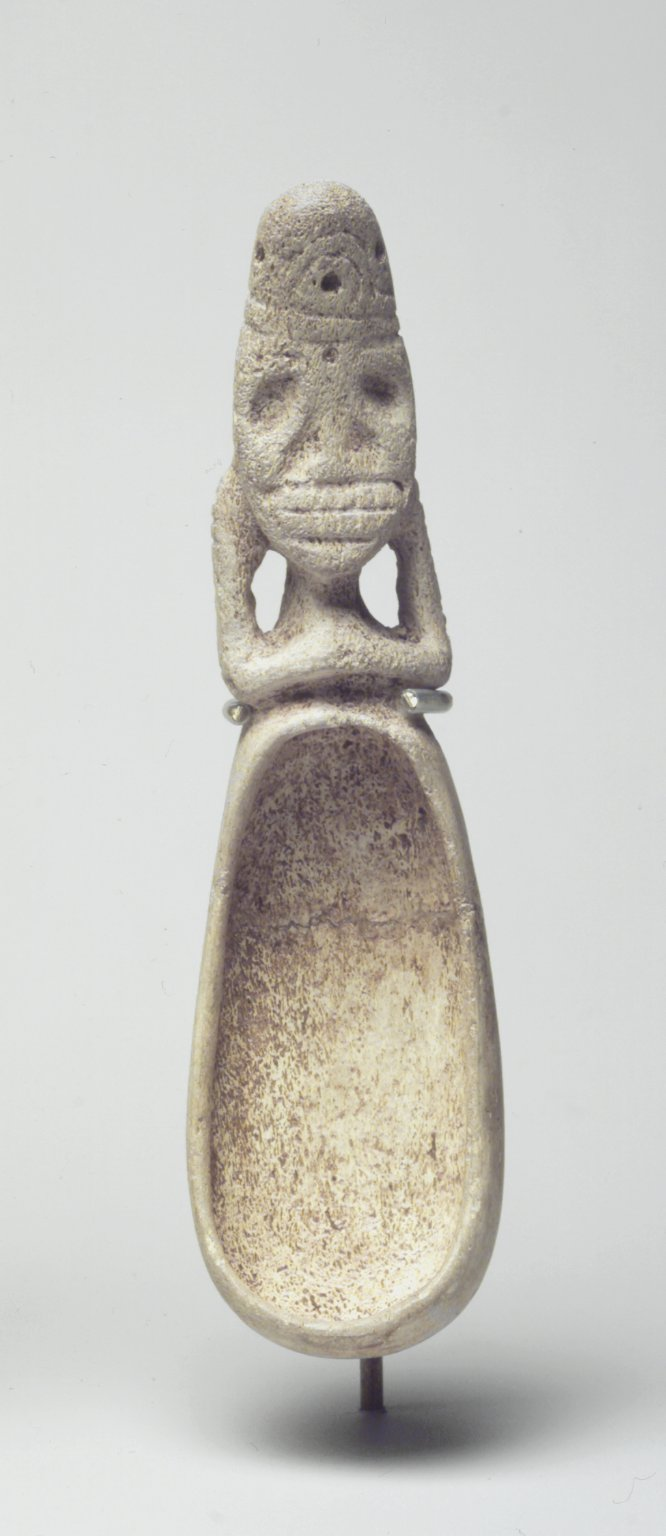
Cohoba Spoon, 1200–1500 Brooklyn Museum

Rock petroglyph overlaid with chalk in the Caguana Indigenous Ceremonial Center in Utuado, Puerto Rico

Some zemís were accompanied by small tables or trays, which are believed to be a receptacle for hallucinogenic snuff called cohoba, prepared from the beans of a species of Piptadenia tree. These trays have been found with ornately carved snuff tubes. Before certain ceremonies, Taínos would purify themselves, either by inducing vomiting (with a swallowing stick) or by fasting. After communal bread was served, first to the zemí, then to the cacique, and then to the common people, the people would sing the village epic to the accompaniment of maraca and other instruments.

One Taíno oral tradition explains that the Sun and Moon came out of caves. Another story tells of the first people, who once lived in caves and only came out at night because it was believed that the Sun would transform them; a sentry became a giant stone at the mouth of the cave, and others became birds or trees. The Taíno believed they were descended from the union of the cultural hero Deminán Caracaracol and a female turtle (who was born of the former's back after being afflicted with a blister). The origin of the oceans is described in the story of a huge flood that occurred when the great spirit Yaya murdered his son Yayael (who was about to murder his father). The father put his son's bones into a gourd or calabash. When the bones turned into fish, the gourd broke, an accident caused by Deminán Caracaracol, and all the water of the world came pouring out.

Taínos believed that Jupias, the souls of the dead, would go to Coaybay, the underworld, and there they rest by day. At night they would assume the form of bats and eat the guava fruit.

== Spanish contact ==
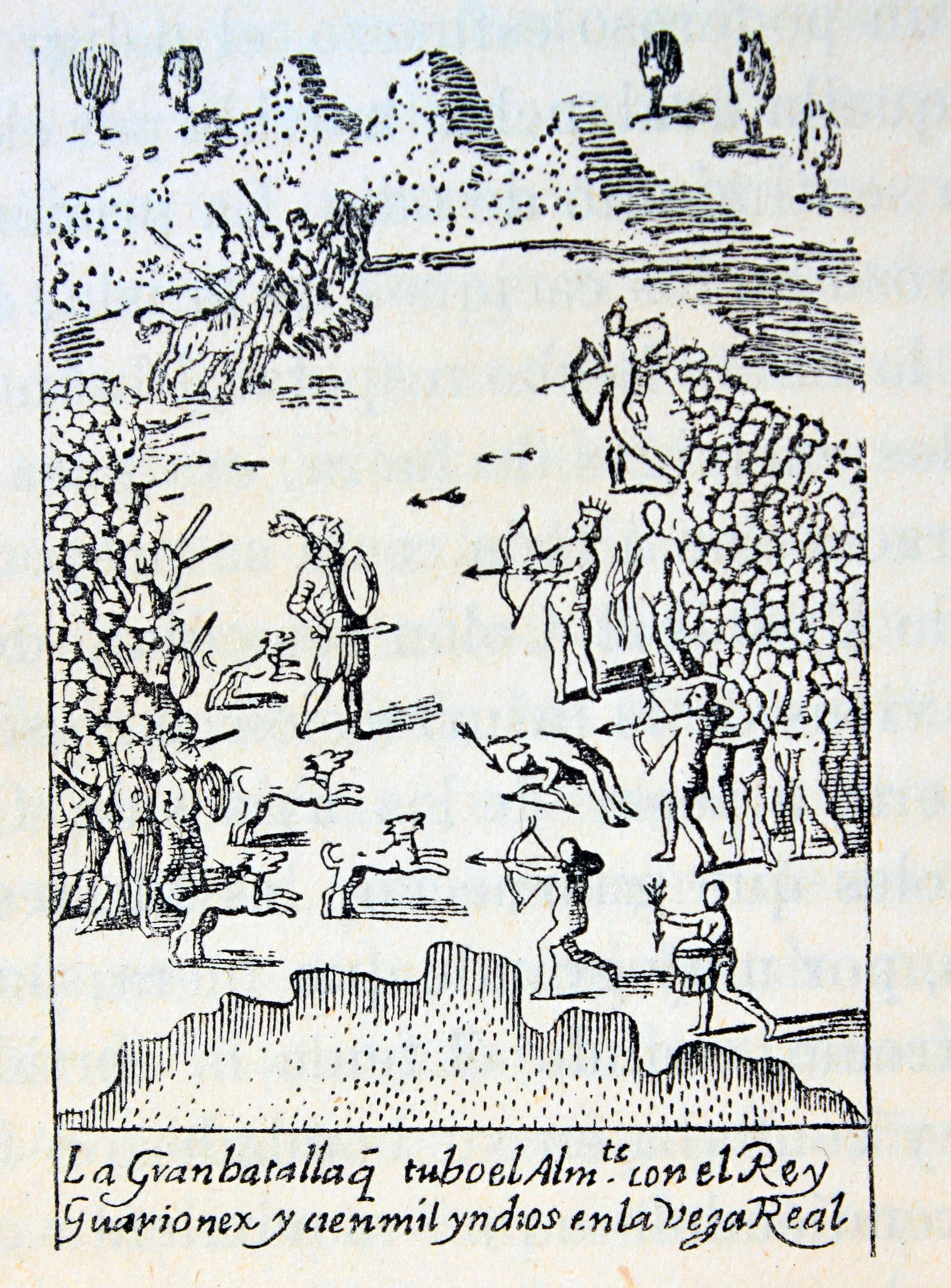
Battle of Vega Real

Columbus and the crew of his ship were the first Europeans to encounter the Taíno people, as they landed in The Bahamas on October 12, 1492. After their first interaction, Columbus described the Taínos as a physically tall, well-proportioned people, with noble and kind personalities.

In his diary, Columbus writes:

They traded with us and gave us everything they had, with good will ... they took great delight in pleasing us ... They are very gentle and without knowledge of what is evil; nor do they murder or steal ... Your highness may believe that in all the world there can be no better people ... They love their neighbors as themselves, and they have the sweetest talk in the world, and are gentle and always laughing.

At this time, the neighbours of the Taíno were the Guanahatabeys in the western tip of Cuba, the Island-Caribs in the Lesser Antilles from Guadeloupe to Grenada, and the Calusa and Ais nations of Florida. Guanahaní was the Taíno name for the island that Columbus renamed San Salvador (Spanish for "Holy Savior"). Columbus erroneously called the Taíno "Indians", a reference that has grown to encompass all the Indigenous peoples of the Western Hemisphere. A group of about 24 Taíno people were abducted and forced to accompany Columbus on his 1494 return voyage to Spain.

On Columbus' second voyage in 1493, he began to demand tribute from the Taíno in Hispaniola. According to Kirkpatrick Sale, each adult over 14 years of age was expected to deliver a hawks bell full of gold every three months, or when this was lacking, 25 pounds of spun cotton. If tribute was not brought, the Spanish cut off the hands of the Taíno and left them to bleed to death. These savage, cruel practices inspired many revolts by the Taíno and campaigns against the Spanish—some being successful, some not. In 1511, Antonio de Montesinos, a Dominican missionary in Hispaniola, became the first European to publicly denounce the abduction and enslavement of the Indigenous peoples of the island and the Encomienda system.

In 1511, several caciques in Puerto Rico, such as Agüeybaná II, Arasibo, Hayuya, Jumacao, Urayoán, Guarionex, and Orocobix, allied with the Carib and tried to oust the Spaniards. The revolt was suppressed by the Indio-Spanish forces of Governor Juan Ponce de León. Hatuey, a Taíno chieftain who had fled from Hispaniola to Cuba with 400 Natives to unite the Cuban Natives, was burned at the stake on February 2, 1512.

In Hispaniola, a Taíno chieftain named Enriquillo mobilised more than 3,000 Taíno in a successful rebellion in the 1520s. These Taíno were accorded land and a charter from the royal administration. Despite the small Spanish military presence in the region, they often used diplomatic divisions and, with help from powerful Native allies, controlled most of the region. In "exchange" for a seasonal salary, and religious and language education, the Taíno were forced to work for Spanish and erroneously labelled "Indian" landowners. This system of labour was part of the encomienda.

== Genocide and depopulation ==
Early population estimates of Hispaniola, thought to have likely been the most populous island inhabited by Taínos, range from 10,000 to 1,000,000 people. The maximum estimates for Jamaica and Puerto Rico are 600,000 people. A 2020 genetic analysis estimated the population to be no more than a few tens of thousands of people. Spanish priest and defender of the Taíno, Bartolomé de las Casas (who had lived in Santo Domingo), wrote in his 1561 multi-volume History of the Indies:

There were 60,000 people living on this island [when I arrived in 1508], including the Indians; so that from 1494 to 1508, over three million people had perished from war, slavery and the mines. Who in future generations will believe this?

Researchers today doubt Las Casas' figures for the pre-contact levels of the Taíno population, considering them an exaggeration. For example, Karen Anderson Córdova estimates a maximum of 500,000 people inhabiting the island. The encomienda system forced many Taíno to work in the fields and mines in so-called exchange for Spanish protection, education, and a seasonal salary. Under the pretence of searching for gold and other materials, many Spaniards took advantage of the regions now under the control of the anaborios and Spanish encomenderos to exploit the Native population by seizing their land and wealth. Historian David Stannard characterises the encomienda as a genocidal system that "had driven many millions of native peoples in Central and South America to early and agonizing deaths." It would take some time before the Taíno revolted against their oppressors—both Native and Spanish alike—and many military campaigns before Emperor Charles V eradicated the encomienda system as a form of enslavement.

Disease played a significant role in the destruction of the Indigenous population, but forced labour was also one of the chief reasons behind the depopulation of the Taíno. The first man to introduce this forced labour among the Taínos was the leader of the European colonisation of Puerto Rico, Ponce de León. Such forced labour eventually led to the Taíno rebellions, to which the Spaniards responded with violent military expeditions known as cabalgadas. The purpose of the military expeditions was to capture the Indigenous people. This violence by the Spaniards was a reason why there was a decline in the Taíno population since it forced many of them to emigrate to other islands and the mainland.

In 30 years, between 80% and 90% of the Taíno population died. Because of the increased number of people (Spanish) on the island, there was a higher demand for food. Taíno cultivation was converted to Spanish methods. In hopes of frustrating the Spanish, some Taínos refused to plant or harvest their crops. The supply of food became so low in 1495 and 1496 that some 50,000 died from famine. Historians have determined that the massive decline was caused more by infectious disease outbreaks than any warfare or direct attacks. By 1507, their numbers had shrunk to 60,000. Scholars believe that epidemic disease (smallpox, influenza, measles, and typhus) was an overwhelming cause of the population decline of the Indigenous people, and also attributed a "large number of Taíno deaths...to the continuing bondage systems" that existed.

Academics such as historian Andrés Reséndez of the University of California, Davis, assert that disease alone does not explain the destruction of Indigenous populations of Hispaniola. While the populations of Europe rebounded following the devastating population decline associated with the Black Death, there was no such rebound for the Indigenous populations of the Caribbean. He concludes that even though the Spanish were aware of deadly diseases such as smallpox, there is no mention of them in the New World until 1519, meaning perhaps they did not spread as fast as initially believed, and that, unlike Europeans, the Indigenous populations were subjected to enslavement, exploitation, and forced labour in gold and silver mines on an enormous scale. Reséndez says that "slavery has emerged as a major killer" of the Indigenous people of the Caribbean. Anthropologist Jason Hickel estimates that the lethal forced labour in these mines killed a third of the Indigenous people there every six months.

== Present ==
Histories of the Caribbean traditionally describe the Taíno as extinct, killed off by disease, slavery, and war with the Spaniards. Contemporary scholarship is more ambivalent, accepting that some degree of Taíno cultural heritage survives in the Caribbean, though many disagree on the extent and meaning of this. Many Caribbean people have a degree of Indigenous descent, usually on the maternal side.

Present-day peoples with Caribbean Indigenous heritage may identify as Taíno, Taíno descendants, or other localised terms, and often come from rural communities such as the jíbaro of Puerto Rico or Jamaica's Yamaye. Although Taíno was originally an exonym, contemporary descendants of the Taínos have begun to reclaim the name and publicly assert a shared Taíno Caribbean-Indigenous identity. They typically describe traditions that have been passed on in secret to evade enslavement or persecution. Groups advocating this point of view are sometimes known as Neo-Taínos—though this is not usually a term they use to describe themselves—and are also established in the Puerto Rican communities located in New Jersey and New York. A few Taíno groups are pushing not only for recognition but respect for their cultural assets.

Scholars who remain sceptical that Taíno culture survived in recognisable form point to the process of mestizaje or creolisation as evidence of the modern Taíno's actual origins. Most Taíno descendants argue that this is evidence for their continued survival, rather than evidence against it, since creolisation allowed their culture and identity to persist while evolving and adapting. According to Antonio Curet, this part of the modern Taíno argument is frequently ignored by sceptical scholars, even though, as he believes, creolisation itself "does not disprove the claims of indigenous survival". Curet suggests, however, that modern Taíno views about creolisation may downplay the contribution of European and especially African heritage, and that this may be seen as anti-African sentiment. Other scholars, such as Pedro Ferbel-Azcarate, dispute this, suggesting that Taíno identities are part of an ongoing process of resisting a Eurocentric mestizo identity which already ignores both African and Indigenous heritage.

Despite the recorded extinction of the Taíno across the Caribbean, historian Ranald Woodaman says the survival of the Taíno is supported by "the enduring (though not unchanged) presence of Native genes, culture, knowledge and identity among the descendants of the Taíno peoples of the region". He also notes the Indigenous and African heritage of communities such as the Maroons, and how these remained distinct from the larger populations while honouring their Taíno predecessors. Taíno-derived customs and identities can be found especially among marginalised rural populations on the Caribbean islands such of Cuba, the Dominican Republic, Jamaica and Puerto Rico.

=== Cuba ===
In isolated parts of eastern Cuba (including areas near El Caney, Yateras and Baracoa), there are Indigenous communities who have maintained their Taíno identities and cultural practices into the 21st century. Reports of Indigenous communities date to the 19th century, from sources as varied as anthropologists, missionaries, military officials and tourists. Abolitionist and British consul to Cuba David Turnbull who visited the island in the 1830s said the inhabitants of Guanabacoa, El Caney and Jiguaní had Indigenous heritage, and he recorded Spanish stories of Taíno who had migrated to "the Yucatan and the Floridas". In the 1840s, José de la Torre reportedly saw 50 "pure blooded" Taíno dancing at El Caney, and researcher Miguel Rodríguez Ferrer reported various Taíno families living in the footholds of the Sierra Maestra. In the 1880s, author Maturin M. Ballou, a sceptic of Taíno survival, said there were reports of an Arawak-Taíno village living near the copper mines "northwest of Santiago de Cuba", and Nicolas Fort y Roldan described encountering the "almost extinct race lucaya", and their settlements in El Caney and Yateras. In the 1890s, author and photographer José de Olivares documented nomadic Indigenous Cubans whom he identified as "the last remnants of that interesting and sorely persecuted race". Most famously, Cuban national icon and poet José Martí reported the aid of "los Indios de Garrido" during the 1895 war of independence.

In the early 20th century, scientist B. E. Fernow reported 28 families of mixed Indigenous people living in isolated settlements in the foothills of the Sierra Maestra, and archaeologist Stewart Culin noted the presence of "full-blooded" Indians near Yateras and Baracoa. The former group had apparently migrated from Santo Domingo; the latter group comprised 800 local Indigenous people, largely from three families: Gainsa, Azahares, and Rojas. Culin also met a Taíno man named José Almenares Argüello, or "Almenares", who said El Caney had once been reserved only for Indians. In 1908 and 1909, explorer Sir Harry Johnston shared reports of "pure-blood" Taínos and recounted seeing mestizos who were "almost as pure breeds" in eastern Cuba, some of whom lived on former "reservations". He distinguished these from the general populace of 1.2 million Spanish Cubans who had various degrees of mixed "Amerindian-Arawak" heritage. Others such as Jesse W. Fewkes and Mark Raymond Harrington reported similar findings, including an additional settlement near Jaruco.

In the 1910s and 1920s, archaeologist J. A. Cosculluela encountered Indigenous families in the Zapata Swamp and apparently corroborated their lineage by visiting the local cemetery. In the 1940s, archaeologist Irving Rouse reported the existence of "pure blooded" Taíno or "Indios de las orillas" at Camagüey. Historian Pichardo Moya, in his address to the Cuban Academy of History in 1945, criticised "the widely accepted opinion" that the Indigenous Cubans were "practically exterminated". He blamed this viewpoint on nationalistic histories that overlooked evidence of "Indian" heritage. Anthropologist and geneticist Reginald Ruggles Gates reported many "Indian descent people" and people who were "pure Indians", especially women, noting Indigenous families with the surnames Gainsa, Ramírez and Rojas.

When anthropologists Manuel Rivero de la Calle and Milan Pospisil analysed Cuba's Indigenous communities, they suggested those in the east were likely of Taíno heritage, rather than from the newer Yucatecan Mayan community living in the west. There are also Indigenous communities who migrated to Cuba from Florida and other parts of the mainland, who in some cases intermarried with local Taíno communities.

Jason M. Yaremko says there are many organised communities of Amerindians currently living in Cuba, many of whom have an Arawak-Taíno identity, and that a number of these are even "pure bloods". He suggests that Euro-American views from the 18th century onward, which saw race and Indigeneity in terms of essentialism and "primordiality", insisted on "narratives of disappearance" for Indigenous peoples and imposed upon them alternate identities as "white, black, or mulatto". In his view, Eurocentric perspectives saw the decline of the Indigenous peoples—whether through extinction or dilution—as the inevitable conclusion of the "heroic saga of civilisation". Subsequent attempts to promote a singular Cuban national identity which transcended race and ethnicity, he says, may have "suffocated" more complex identities for the sake of "national unity", impacting both Afro-Cubans and Amerindian Cubans. But he says this Amerindian identity has nevertheless persisted in Cuba, "whether as 'Indios' in pueblos indios, as individuals in cities and towns, or together in vibrant, if 'invisible' (until recently), rural communities like Yateras". He also suggests that, although the oral histories are "compelling", to address controversies over modern Cuban Taíno identities, this heritage could be "corroborated and reinforced by fieldwork conducted, to begin with, in documentary records contained in Cuba’s former 'Indian towns' and parishes, among other repositories in the country".

=== Dominican Republic ===
Dominican historian Frank Moya Pons documented that Spanish colonists intermarried with Taíno women. Over time, some of their mixed-race descendants intermarried with Africans, creating a culture with Creole features. Census records from 1514 reveal that 40% of Spanish men on Hispaniola had Taíno wives. Nevertheless, Spanish documents declared the Taíno to be extinct in the 16th century, as early as 1550.

From the second half of the 19th century, an idealised image of an Indigenous past – particularly of Taíno culture – became increasingly prominent in Dominican literature and contributed to the nation's indigenismo movement. Scholars such as Gabriel Haslip-Viera and J. Alcántara Almánzar have suggested this was motivated, at least in part, by attempts to distance the nation and its people from its African heritage, and from Haitians. The term Indio, traditionally referring to Taíno-Arawak peoples, subsequently became a term of self-identity for the majority of Dominicans, expanding into various social categories rooted in colourism and skin-tone, from Indio Oscaro (dark) to Indio Lavado (medium) and Indio Claro (light).

Scholars note that contemporary rural Dominicans retain elements of Taíno culture including linguistic features, agricultural practices, food ways, medicine, fishing practices, technology, architecture, oral history, and religious views, even though such cultural traits may be considered backward in the cities. Among these rural communities, some families and individuals also identify as Taíno.

=== Jamaica ===
Yamaye Taíno communities are based in several towns, and they are often located by the coasts or in mountain regions. The Yamaye Guani (lit. 'Jamaican hummingbird') Taíno People represents Yamaye Taíno people on the island, and advocates for recognition of Indigenous rights for the Jamaican Taíno. The organisation has both enrolled and unenrolled members. Enrolled members may undergo a process where they receive a Yamaye Iri (lit. 'name of the land') to formally recognise their membership and responsibilities. Some Yamaye Taíno groups also have historic ancestral links to Jamaican Maroons.

Evidence suggests that some Taíno women and African men intermarried and lived in relatively isolated Maroon communities in the interior of the islands, where they developed into a mixed-race population who were relatively independent of Spanish authorities. For instance, when Jamaica was under the rule of Spain (known then as the colony of Santiago), both Taíno men and women fled to the Bastidas Mountains (Blue Mountains), where they intermingled with escaped enslaved Africans. They were among the ancestors of the Jamaican Maroons of the east, including those communities led by Juan de Bolas and Juan de Serras. The Maroons of Moore Town claim descent from the Taíno. The Yamaye Council of Indigenous Leaders, originally founded as the Maroon Secretariat, includes both Maroon and Taíno groups.

=== United States, Puerto Rico and the U.S. Virgin Islands ===
Indigenous peoples are recorded later in Puerto Rico than on many other Caribbean islands. The Puerto Rican census of 1777 listed 1,756 indios, while the 1787 census listed 2,032. It is not clear, however, which groups were counted as indios at the time and how accurate the census data were—some indios may have remained hidden or lived in isolated and remote communities to avoid enslavement or worse. Puerto Rican historian Loida Figueroa has suggested that all Native Puerto Ricans were considered Indian until the beginning of the 19th century, when they were subsequently labelled pardos by Governor don Toribio Montes, who struggled to fit the multiethnic non-whites into American racial categories. Oral histories collected from elders by Juan Manuel Delgado in 1977 indicate that individuals classified as "Indians" persisted into the 19th century, particularly in the region of Las Indieras.

By the late 19th and early 20th centuries, Puerto Rico was subjected to various attempts at Americanisation, including through educational institutions. This included the teaching of English and the requirement to wear Anglo-American clothing. State-sponsored education promoted a rural jibaro culture – primarily figured as white, Catholic and Hispanic – as a symbol of Puerto Rican culture, seeking to distance Puerto Ricans from political nationalism and promote values of humility and Americanised self-help. Some Puerto Rican children were also sent to the Carlisle Indian Industrial School, the flagship among American Indian boarding schools, including children with Taíno heritage.

At the 2010 U.S. census, 1,098 people in Puerto Rico identified as "Puerto Rican Indian", 1,410 identified as "Spanish American Indian", and 9,399 identified as "Taíno". In total, 35,856 Puerto Ricans identified as Indigenous. A consistent explanation given by modern Taíno/Boricuas for their survival is that their families lived, at least for a time, close to the mountainous interior of the island, which they call Las Indieras ("the place of the Indians"). Anthropologist Sherina Feliciano-Santos says these areas typically have an increased prevalence of Indigenous foods, customs and vocabulary than elsewhere.

People with Indigenous heritage in Puerto Rico may call themselves Boricua, after the Indigenous word for the island, as well as or instead of Taíno. Local Taíno/Boricua groups have also begun attempts to reconstruct a distinct Taíno language, called Taíney, often extrapolating from other Arawakan languages and using a modified version of the Latin alphabet.

The Guainía Taíno Tribe has been recognised as a tribe by the governor of the US Virgin Islands.

=== Taíno revivalist communities ===
In 1976, The Millville Daily of New Jersey reported that the Puerto Rican Culture Club of Culver School was engaging in the study of Taíno heritage.

A 1988 opinion piece in The Daily Journal of Vineland, New Jersey, noted the existence of Taíno revivalism, stating that archaeologists were investigating Puerto Rico's Taíno heritage and that "Boricuas flock to ceremonial grounds such as the one found in Tibes...in search of a tie with the past." The piece states that while Puerto Ricans have historically been proud of their Spanish ancestry, some Puerto Ricans in recent years had begun to reassess the Spanish role in colonialism and embrace Indigenous heritage.

As of 2006, there were a couple of dozen activist Taíno descendant organisations from Florida to Puerto Rico and California to New York with growing memberships numbering in the thousands. These efforts are known as the Taíno restoration, a revival movement for Taíno culture that seeks to revive and reclaim Taíno heritage, as well as official recognition of the survival of the Taíno people. Historian Ranald Woodaman describes the modern Taíno movement as "a declaration of Native survival through mestizaje (genetic and cultural mixing over time), reclamation and revival".

In Puerto Rico, the history of the Taíno is being taught in schools, where children learn about the Taíno culture and identity through dance, costumes, and crafts. Martínez Cruzado, a geneticist at the University of Puerto Rico at Mayagüez said celebrating and learning about their Taíno roots is helping Puerto Ricans feel connected.

Scholar Yolanda Martínez-San Miguel sees the development of a Neo-Taíno movement in Puerto Rico as a useful counter to the domination of the island by the United States and the Spanish legacies of island society. She also notes that "what could be seen as a useless anachronistic reinvention of a 'Boricua coqui' identity can also be conceived as a productive example of Spivak's 'strategic essentialism'". Scholar Gabriel Haslip-Viera suggests that the Taíno revival movements which emerged among marginalised Puerto Rican communities, especially from the 1980s and 1990s, are a response to US racism and Reaganism, which produced hostile political and socioeconomic conditions in the Caribbean.

=== DNA studies ===
In 2018, a DNA study mapped the genome of a tooth belonging to an 8th- to 10th-century Taíno woman from the Bahamas. The research team compared the genome to 104 Puerto Ricans who participated in the 1000 Genomes Project (2008), who had 10 to 15 percent Indigenous American ancestry. The results suggest they were more "closely related to the ancient Bahamian genome" than to any other Indigenous American group.

Although most do not identify as such, DNA evidence suggests that a large proportion of the current populations of the Greater Antilles have Taíno ancestry, with 61% of Puerto Ricans, up to 30% of Dominicans, and 33% of Cubans having mitochondrial DNA of Indigenous origin. Some groups have reportedly maintained Taíno or indio customs to some degree.

Sixteen autosomal studies of peoples in the Spanish-speaking Caribbean and its diaspora (mostly Puerto Ricans) have shown that between 10% and 20% of their DNA is Indigenous. Some individuals have slightly higher scores, and others have lower scores or no Indigenous DNA at all. A recent study of a population in eastern Puerto Rico, where the majority of persons tested claimed Taíno ancestry, shows that they had 61% mtDNA (distant maternal ancestry) from Indigenous peoples and 0% Y-chromosome DNA (distant paternal ancestry) from the Indigenous people. This suggests part of the Creole population descends from unions between Taíno women and European or African men.

== See also ==
- Ciboney
- Garifuna
- Guahaba Museum
- Hupia, spirit of the dead
- Indigenismo
  - Indigenismo in Mexico
- Indigenous Amerindian genetics
- List of Taínos
- Palapa (structure)
- Pomier Caves
- Tibes Indigenous Ceremonial Center
- Yamaye
