= Zemi =

Indigenous Caribbean deity or ancestral spirit, and a sculptural object housing the spirit

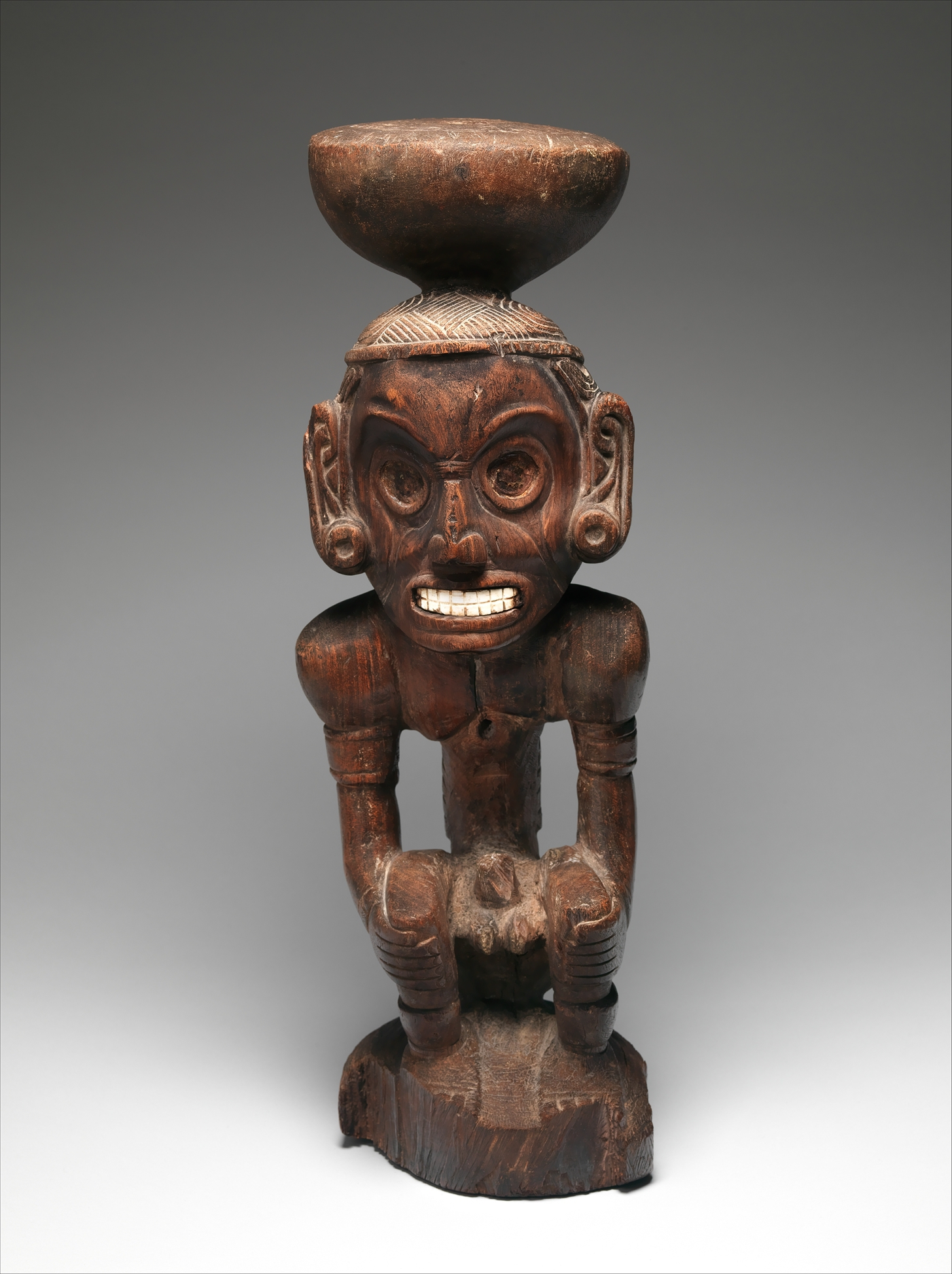
Zemi figure, Ironwood with shell inlay. 27 in. (68.5 cm) high. Dominican Republic: 15th-16th century. The bowl atop the figure's head was used to hold cohoba during rituals.

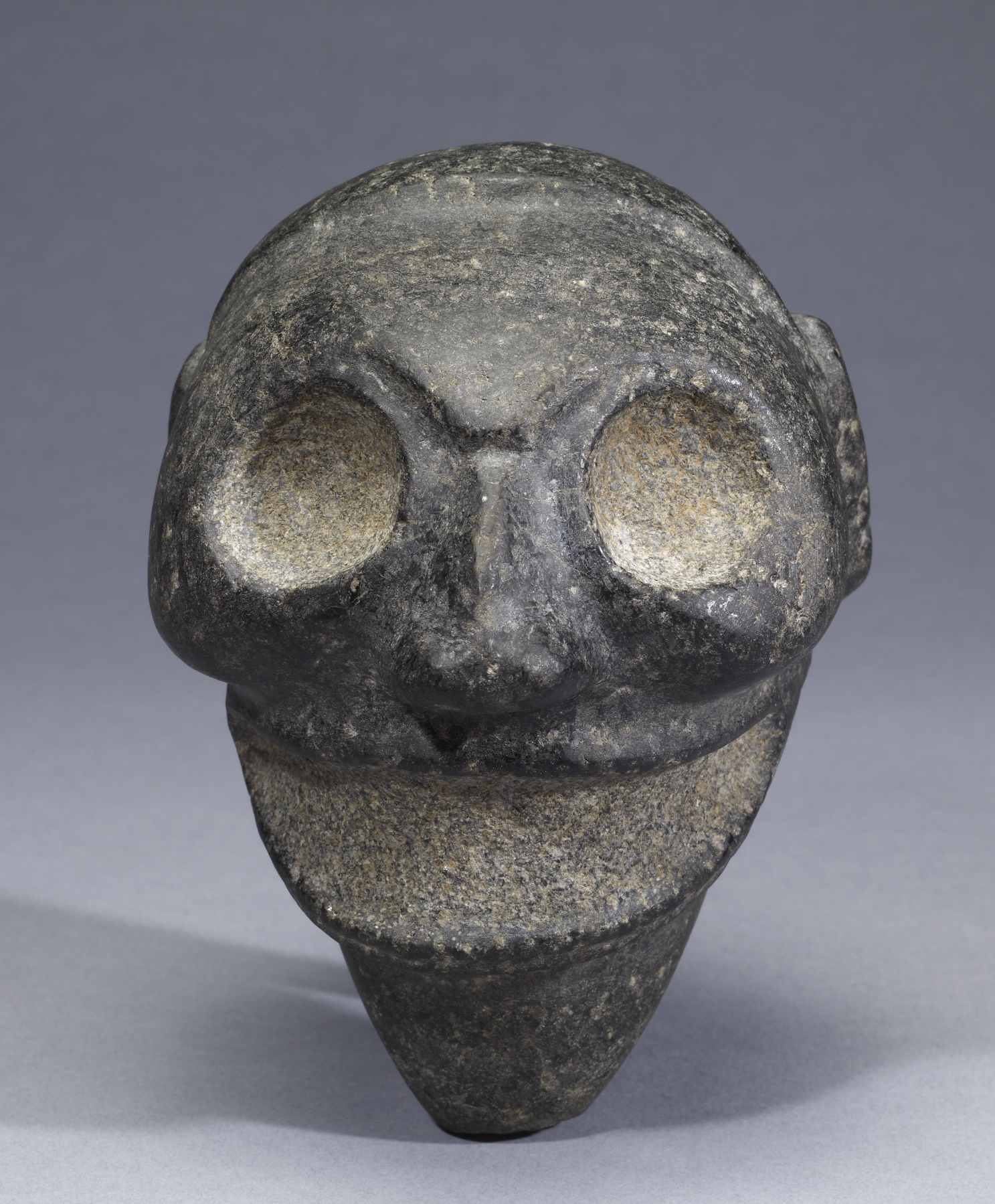
Taino Zemi mask from Walters Art Museum

A zemi or cemi (Taino pronunciation: [sɛmi]) was a deity or ancestral spirit, and a sculptural object housing the spirit, among the Indigenous peoples of the Caribbean, including the Taíno and the Macorix. Cemi’no or Zemi’no is the plural word for the spirits.

== Theology ==
The Indigenous religion of the Greater Antilles, as recorded by late 15th and 16th century Spaniards, centered on a supreme creator god and a fertility goddess. The creator god is Yúcahu Maórocoti and he governs the growth of the staple food, the cassava. The goddess is Attabeira, who governs water, rivers, and seas. Lesser deities govern natural forces and are also zemis. Boinayel, the Rain Giver, is one such zemi, whose magical tears become rainfall. Spirits of ancestors, also zemis, were highly honored, particularly those of caciques or chiefs. Bones or skulls might be incorporated into sculptural zemis or reliquary urns. Ancestral remains would be housed in shrines and given offerings, such as food.

Zemis could be consulted by medicine people for advice and healing. During these consultation ceremonies, images of the zemi could be painted or tattooed on the body of a priest, who was known as a Bohuti or Buhuithu. The reliquary zemis would help their own descendants in particular.

== Religious art ==
Sculptural zemis, or "amuletic zemis", take many forms, but the most characteristically Taíno art form is the three-point stone zemi. One side of the stone might have a human or animal head with the opposite side having hunched legs. These are sometimes known as "frog's legs" due to their positioning. The fierce face of the creator god is often portrayed. Very small ceramic three-point zemis have been uncovered by archaeologists in the Lesser Antilles, as well as Colombia and Venezuela, dating back to 200 BCE. Small amuletic zemis would be worn on warriors' foreheads for protection in battle.

Zemis are sculpted from a wide variety of materials, including bone, clay, wood, shell, sandstone, and stone. They are found in Cuba, Dominican Republic, Haiti, Jamaica, Puerto Rico, and other Caribbean islands. Some are quite large, up to 100 cm tall. Some are effigies of birds, snakes, alligators and other animals, but most are human effigies. Even twin human figures are portrayed.

Wooden zemis were preserved in relatively dry caves. It is believed that Taíno people hid their ceremonial objects in caves, away from the Spanish, or destroyed them to avoid having them fall into Spanish hands.

=== Beaded zemis ===
Two of the most elaborate surviving zemis are housed in European museums. One is a belt with a zemi from the Greater Antilles. The belt dates from circa 1530 and is made of cotton, white and red snail shells, black seeds, pearls, glass, and obsidian. It is housed in the Museum für Völkerkunde in Vienna.

The second is housed in the Pigorini National Museum of Prehistory and Ethnography in Rome. Until 1952, it was wrongly labeled as an African fetish, but scholars have confirmed that it is Taíno from the early 16th century and exhibits elements of Caribbean, European, and African artistic influences.

== Gallery ==
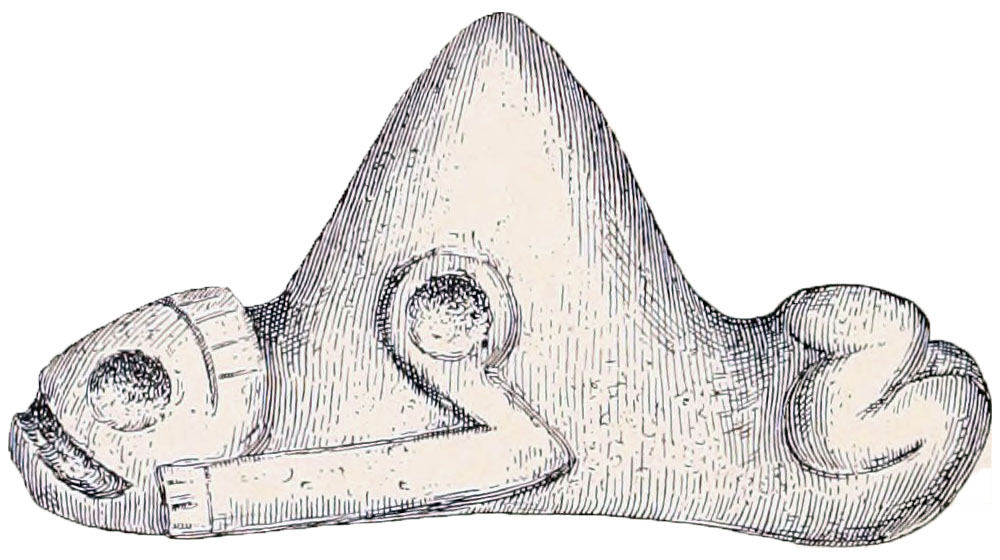
Three-pointed stone which was in the private collection of Mr. Yunghannis of Bayamón, in the late 19th century

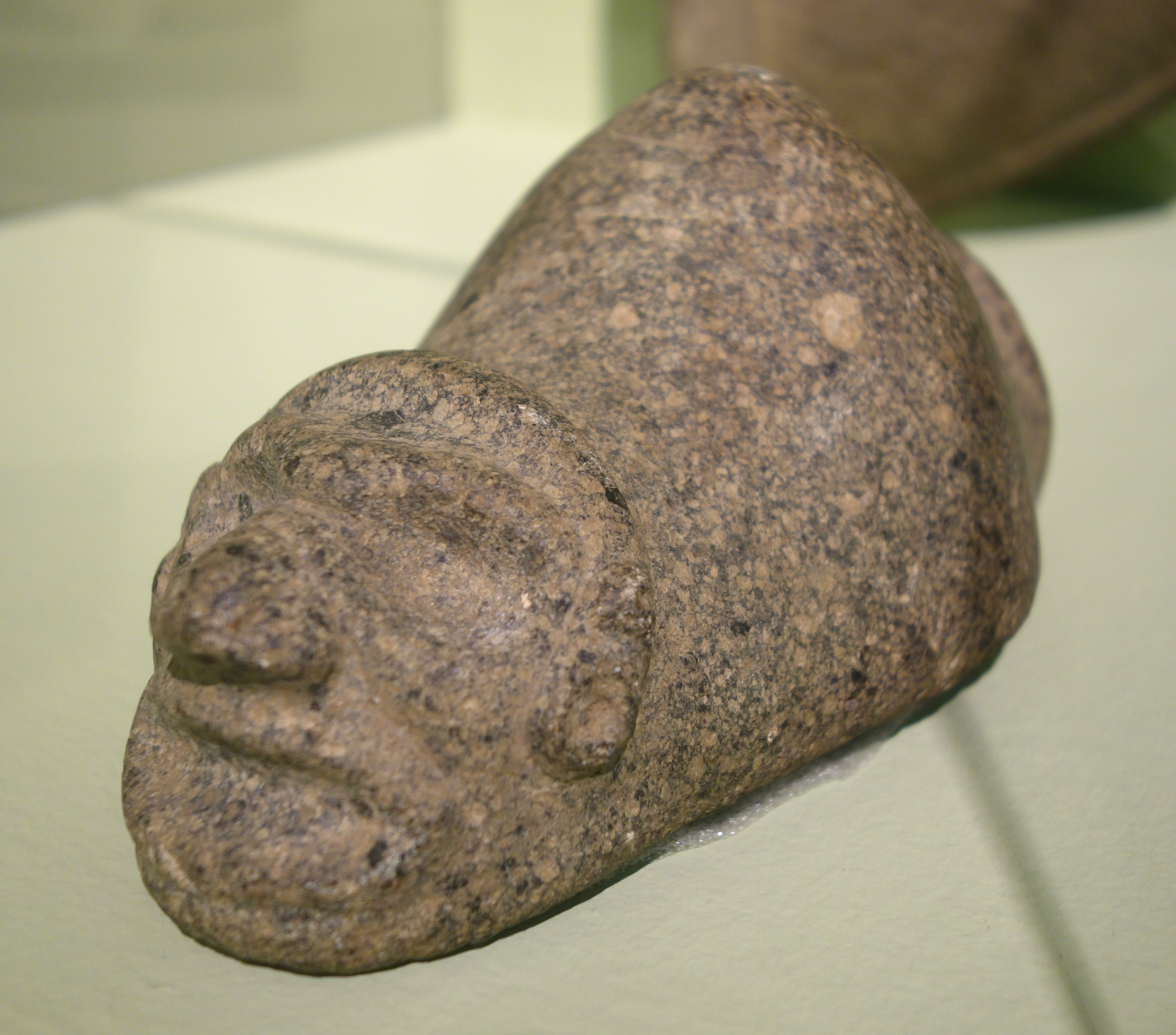
Three-pointed sculpture with carved face c. 1000-1494 CE

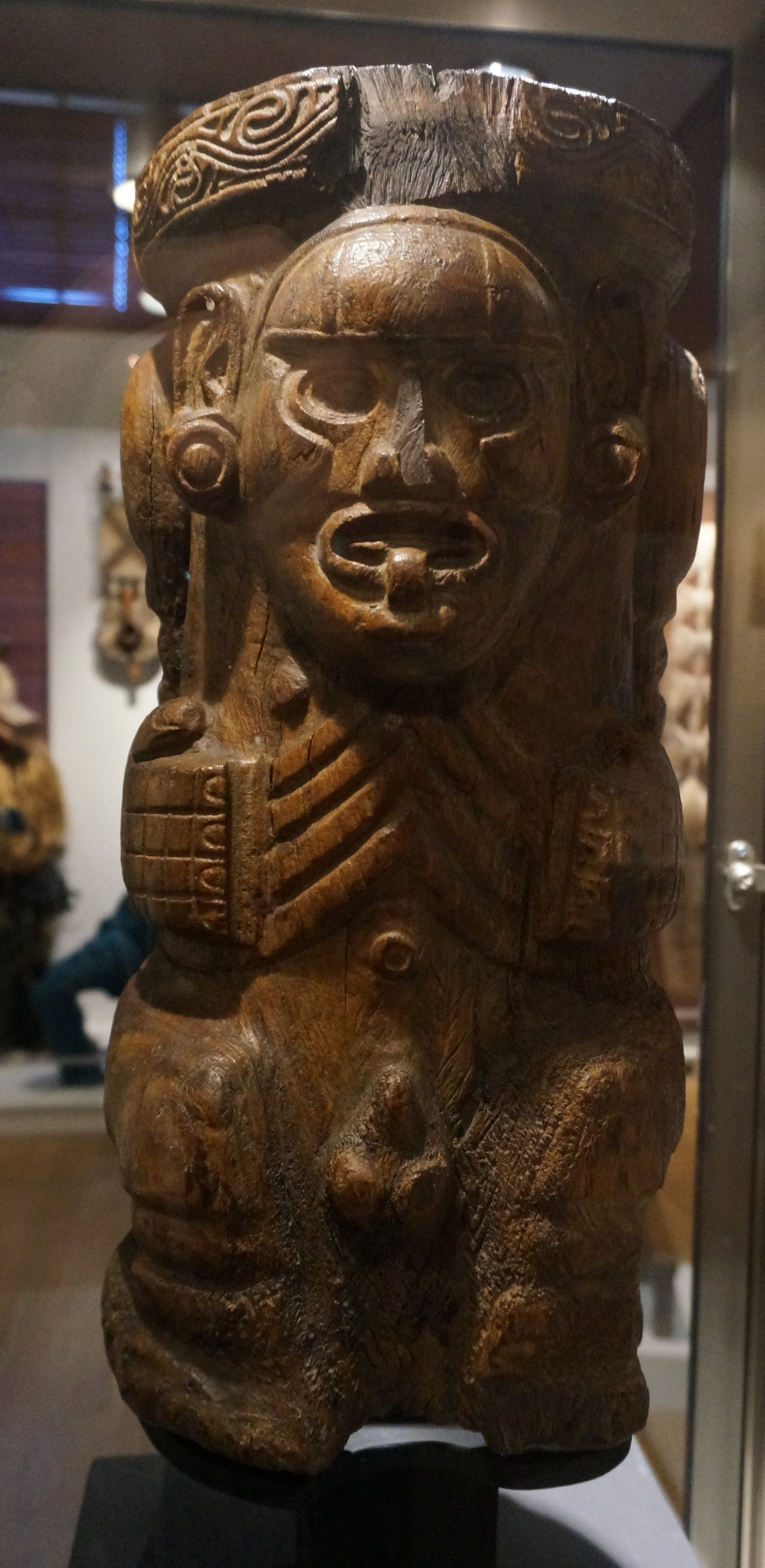
Displayed at the Barrois Museum, France

== See also ==
- Museo el Cemí
