= Yúcahu =

Masculine spirit of fertility in Taíno mythology

Yucahú Bagua Maórokoti
- God of creation, the sky, the sea, bountiful harvest and peace
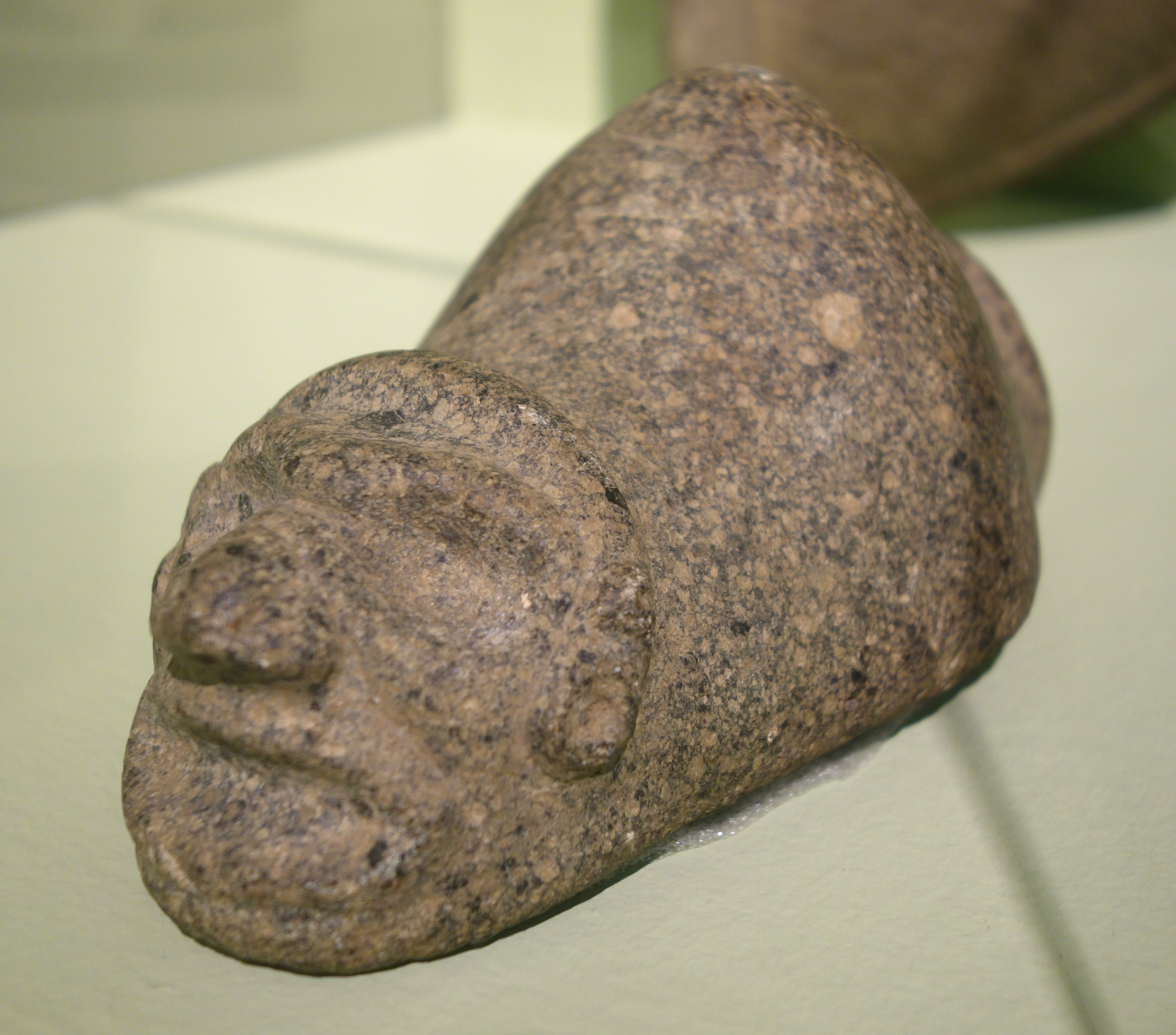
- A stone representation of the three-pointed zemi found in Puerto Rico (c. 1000-1494 AD)
- Symbol: Three-pointed zemi, frog, rain, cassava and derivatives
- Parents: Atabey (mother)

Yúcahu —also written as Yucahú Guama Bagua Maórocoti, Yukajú, Yocajú, 𝗬𝗼𝗰𝗮𝗵𝘂, or Yokahu— was the masculine spirit of fertility in Taíno mythology. He was the supreme deity or zemi of the Pre-Columbian Taíno people along with his mother Atabey who was his feminine counterpart. Dominant in the Caribbean region at the time of Cristopher Columbus’ first voyages of discovery, the peoples associated with Taíno culture inhabited the islands of the Bahamas, the Greater Antilles, and the Lesser Antilles.

== Mythology ==
Yúcahu was the supreme deity of the Taíno people. "They call him Yúcahu Bagua Maórocoti" is the earliest mention of the zemí taken from the first page of Fray Ramón Pané's Account of the Antiquities of the Indians. As the Taíno did not possess a written language, the name is the phonetic spelling as recorded by the Spanish missionaries, Ramón Pané, and Bartolomé de las Casas. The three names are thought to represent the Great Spirit's epithets. Yúcahu means spirit or giver of cassava. Bagua has been interpreted as meaning both "the sea" itself and "master of the sea." The name Maórocoti implies that he was conceived without male intervention. He was also later known as "El Gigante Dormido", or "Sleeping Giant".

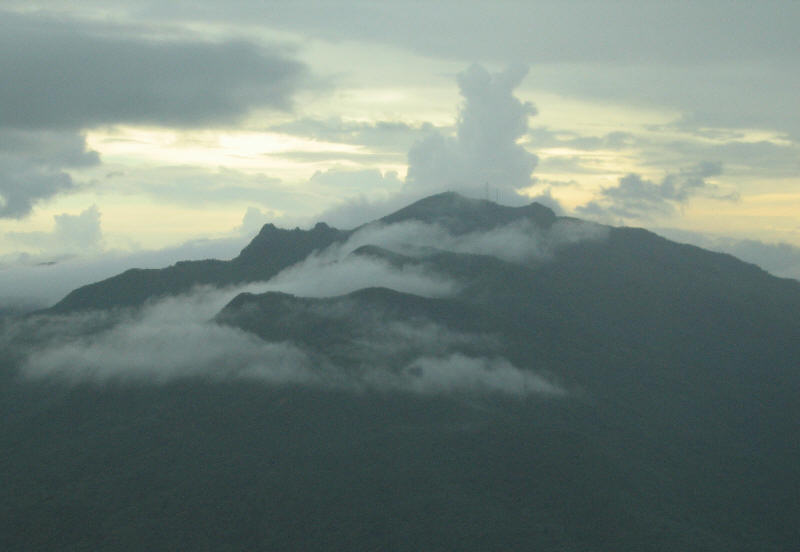
El Yunque peak in Puerto Rico

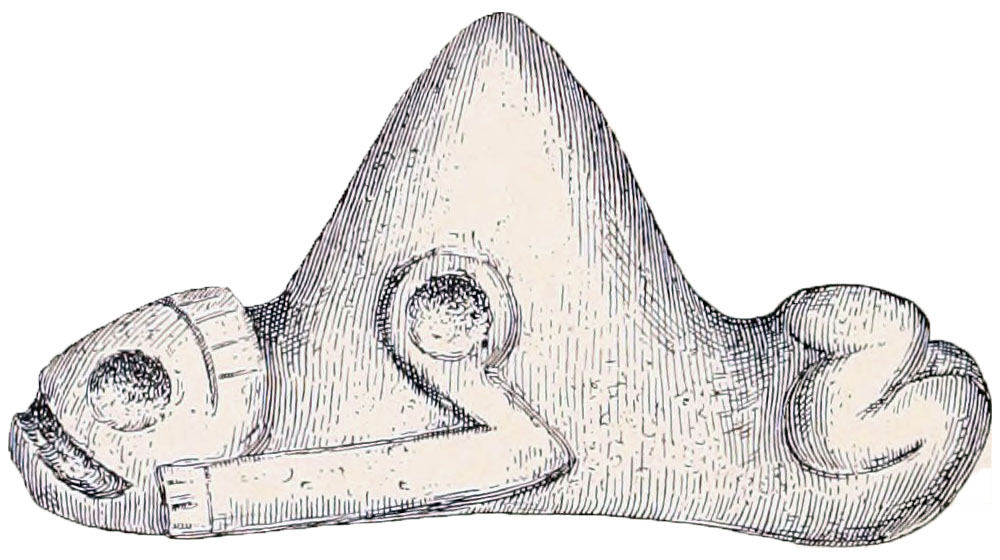
Diagram of zemi, a three-pointed stone which was owned by someone in Bayamón, Puerto Rico

Yúcahu became known as the deity of agriculture, representing goodness. The Taíno referred to the peak as Yuké, or "The White Lands", in reference to the thick cloud shroud that always surrounds it. This mountain range diverts the wind of hurricanes, minimizing the damage that the storms do to the lower parts of the island. Located in the northern mountains of Puerto Rico, the region where El Yunque was originally known as "Yukiyu". Following the Spanish colonization, it became known under the Hispanized variant of Luquillo, a name that remains in use.

== Modern usage ==
=== Religious ===
Adaptations of traditional Taíno religion are practiced by a number of neo-Taíno groups, featuring Yúcahu as part of their pantheons.

=== Cultural ===
As with other mythologies, Taíno religion and the good/evil (in this case Yúcahu/Juracán) dichotomy has been adapted for comic books, in particular being central as the source of supernatural superpowers in Edgardo Miranda Rodríguez's La Borinqueña.

Preceding the impending passing of hurricanes Irma and Maria over Puerto Rico during the 2017 Atlantic hurricane season, artistic representations depicting an updated model of Yúcahu (as the sentient embodiment of El Yunque, distinguished by a humanoid form composed by the forest's vegetation) became widespread in social media as a method to boost the population's morale.

== Bibliography ==
- Fray Ramón Pané (1999). José Juan Arrom (ed.). An Account of the Antiquities of the Indians. Susan C. Giswold (trans.). Durham, NC ;London: Duke Univ. Press. ISBN 978-0-8223-2347-1. "A New Edition, with an Introductory Study, Notes, & Appendixes by José Juan Arrom"
- Arroyo, Antonio M. Stevens (2006). Cave of the Jagua : the mythological world of the Taínos (2. ed.). Scranton [u.a.]: Univ. of Scranton Press. ISBN 1-58966-112-5.
- Rouse, Irving (1993). Tainos : Rise and Decline of the People Who Greeted Columbus (New ed.). New Haven: Yale University Press. ISBN 0-300-05696-6.
- American Anthropologist. Original from the University of California: American Anthropological Association. 1909. pp. 354–356.
