= Crónica de Indias =

Genre of Spanish historical literature

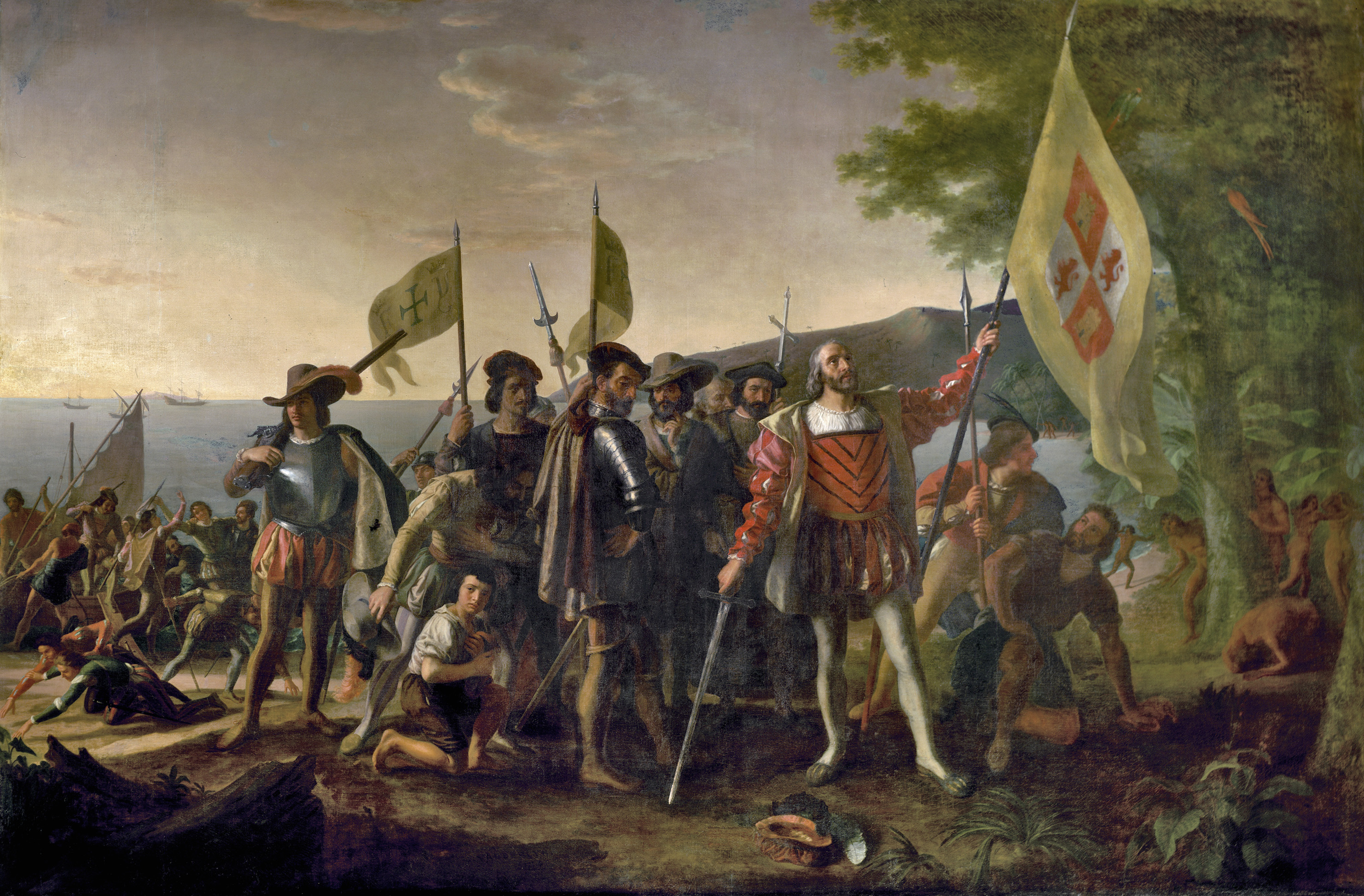
The logbook which Columbus kept during his first voyage is deemed the earliest crónica de Indias

A crónica de Indias (Note: Spanish for chronicle of the Indies. Plural: crónicas de Indias. Also known as: crónicas de indias, crónicas de Indias Occidentales. In English, also known as: Spanish chronicles, chronicles of the New World, chronicles of the Indies, chronicles of the Americas. In these Spanish names, Indias or Indias Occidentales are historical toponyms for the Americas.) is a Spanish chronicle (crónica) whose subject matter is the New World (the Indias) during the Age of Discovery or time of Spanish conquest, colonisation, or Catholic proselytisation. These crónicas were especially known in the 16th century, and, like Spanish crónicas generally, constitute an historical genre of Spanish non-fiction with popular and scholarly relevance today. The author of such a work is known as a cronista de Indias, (Note: Spanish for chronicler of the Indies. Plural: cronistas de Indias. Also known as: cronistas de indias, cronistas de Indias Occidentales. In English, also known as: Spanish chroniclers. In these Spanish names, Indias or Indias Occidentales are historical toponyms for the Americas.) though from 1526 onwards, said term was also an official position bestowed upon select chroniclers (cronistas) by royal appointment. The office was later termed cronista mayor de Indias (Note: Spanish for high chronicler of the Indies.) from 1571.

== Background ==
The cronistas were men of the Spanish Empire who, during a time of great illiteracy in said region, happened to be literate. These included clergy and laity, conquistadors or other martial men, officials or office-holders, and even those born in Spanish America (including criollo, Amerindian and Mestizo men). Some of them wrote first-hand accounts (of things which they themselves witnessed or participated in), some wrote second-hand accounts (based on oral or written accounts by eyewitnesses or direct participants), whilst others still wrote accounts even further removed from their subject. Some of them published their work themselves, whereas some left theirs as manuscripts (often posthumously published for them, sometimes centuries later). Virtually all were beholden to personal biases or ideologies (providencialismo, (Note: Belief in divine providence.) Spanish monarchism, so on), or some other authorities (a caudillo, a Spanish institution, their family, so on), often resulting in heavily skewed crónicas.

The crónicas, then, do not invariably agree in their accounts, and do not necessarily present only facts. But as modern scholars may account for such shortcomings, they therefore remain a mainstay of academic work (in history, anthropology, so on) on the period and area. In addition to strictly chronicling historical events, some crónicas further included descriptions of natural geography (features, flora, fauna, so on) and of human geography (peoples, their politics, customs, languages, so on). Most crónicas were written in Spanish, whilst some were wholly or partly written in other Romance or Amerindian languages (Latin, Italian, so on). Most were written in the Latin script, though a few further featured Mesoamerican scripts. Most were written in prose, though a few were laid out in verse (as epic poems).

The earliest crónica was the logbook kept by Christopher Columbus during his first voyage in 1492–1493. The first official crónicas were either Peter Martyr's Decades, written by 1525, or else Gonzalo Fernandez de Oviedo's Historia, written by 1542. (Note: Martyr deemed first in. Oviedo deemed first in. The office of cronista de Indias was created in 1526, when fray Antonio de Guevara was appointed to it. Guevara wrote no crónica, and was succeeded by Fernandez de Oviedo on 18 August 1532. Martyr was never appointed cronista de Indias, though he did hold a royal appointment as cronista.) The latest crónicas were written or published in the 18th century.

== List ==
The following is a list of cronistas and their crónicas. It includes any work so identified by modern or contemporary literature, along with pertinent dates and information. As of August 2026, it listed 26 works.

Tabular list of cronistas de Indias and crónicas de Indias, along with: dates of writing and publishing, yes/no information on whether the cronista was ever in the New World, notes, citations.
Cronista	Crónica	Date written	Date first published	Was in Indias? (Note: Was this cronista in the New World before or during their writing of this crónica?)	Notes	
Aguilar	Relación breve (Note: Long title: Relación breve de la conquista de Nueva España.)	1559 to 1571	1903	Yes	—N/a	
Acosta	Historia natural y moral (Note: Long title: Historia natural y moral de las Indias.)	?	1590	?	Divided into a "natural" part (geography, fauna, flora) and a "moral" part (history, religion, institutions of Mexico and Peru); one of the earliest scientific syntheses of the New World.	
Aguado	Recopilación historial (Note: Long title: Recopilación historial de Venezuela.)	1575 to 1578	20th century	Yes	Franciscan who spent over fifteen years as a missionary in the Nuevo Reino de Granada; covers events of 1524 to 1569 in present-day Colombia and Venezuela.	
Alva Ixtlilxóchitl	Historia de la nación chichimeca	circa 1640	?	Yes	Written by a mestizo cronista descended from the rulers of Acolhuacan and Tenochtitlan; recounts the Chichimec lineage, favouring the Texcoco perspective on the conquest.	
Alvarado Tezozómoc	Crónica mexicana	circa 1598	1878	Yes	Grandson of Moctezuma II and Nahuatl interpreter at the Real Audiencia of Mexico; based on oral tradition and pre-Hispanic codices.	
Álvarez Chanca	Carta al cabildo de Sevilla	1494	?	Yes	A physician from Seville who took part in Columbus's second voyage; one of the earliest European sources on the Caribbean.	
Betanzos	Suma y relación de los incas	by 1551	1880 (partial)	Yes	An interpreter for Pizarro, married to a noble Inca woman, giving him privileged access to the Cuzco elite.	
Cabello de Balboa	Miscelánea Antártica	1576 to 1586	?	Yes	Combines biblical and European history with Inca history, from the creation of the world to Atahualpa's death in 1532; includes the legend of Naymlap.	
Cabello de Balboa	Verdadera descripción de las Esmeraldas (Note: Long title: Verdadera descripción y relación larga de la Provincia y Tierra de las Esmeraldas.)	1583	?	Yes	Documents a 1577 expedition to evangelise the indigenous and Black communities of the Esmeraldas region (present-day Ecuador).	
Cadena	Los actos y hazañas valerosas (Note: Long title: Los actos y hazañas valerosas del capitán Diego Hernández de Serpa.)	1563 to 1564	?	?	An epic poem celebrating the conquest of Nueva Andalucía (present-day eastern Venezuela); possibly the oldest poem written in the Americas in a European language.	
Calancha	Crónica moralizada de los agustinos del Perú	?	1638	Yes	The first and most important Augustinian crónica in Peru; a moral and providentialist interpretation of events.	
Carvajal	Relación del nuevo descubrimiento del famoso río Grande de las Amazonas	after 1541	1894	Yes	A Dominican friar, eyewitness and survivor of Francisco de Orellana's 1541 expedition down the Amazon.	—N/a
Carvajal	Relación del descubrimiento del río Apure hasta su ingreso en el Orinoco	?	1648	Yes	A Dominican friar; provides extensive geographic and ethnographic information on the Llanos region of Venezuela.	
Casas	Memoriales (Note: Spanish for memoranda. Also known as: memoriales de los agravios, de los remedios y de las denuncias, memorial de agravios, memorial de remedios, memorial de denuncias. Not to be confused with his later memos, like the memoriales de remedios of April 1518, nor the memoriales of 1543.)	?	1516	Yes	First crónica on la defensa de los indios; first to propose a república de españoles and república de los indios (Note: A form of sociopolitical organisation within the Spanish caste system.)	
Casas	Historia (Note: Long title: Historia de las Indias. Not to be confused with the Historia general de las Indias, published 1551, nor the Apologética historia sumaria, written from 1527 to 1558.)	1527 to 1561	1875 to 1876	Yes	—N/a	
Casas	Brevísima relación (Note: Long title: Brevísima relación de la destrucción de las Indias.)	1539 to 1542	1552	Yes	Crónica most credited for the Spanish Black Legend	
Castellanos	Elegías de varones ilustres (Note: Long title: Elegías de varones ilustres de Indias.)	?	1589 (1st part)	Yes	An historical poem of over 113,000 verses, said to be the longest in the Spanish language; covers the discovery and conquest of the Antilles, Venezuela and the Nuevo Reino de Granada.	
Cervantes de Salazar	Crónica (Note: Long title: Crónica de la Nueva España.)	1557 to 1564	1914	Yes	—N/a	
Cieza de León	Crónica del Perú	?	1553 (1st part)	Yes	Based on the author's direct experience as a soldier and on oral testimony of the quipucamayoc; parts 2–4 remained unpublished until the 19th and 20th centuries.	
Cisneros	Descripción exacta de la provincia de Venezuela	?	1764	?	Describes the geography, economy and main towns of the province of Venezuela, commissioned by the Real Compañía Guipuzcoana.	
Cobo	Historia del Nuevo Mundo	1613 to 1653	1890 to 1895 (partial)	Yes	A Jesuit who lived over sixty years between the viceroyalties of Peru and New Spain; a 43-book encyclopedia of the natural and cultural history of the continent.	
Columbus	Carta a Luis de Santángel	Feb 1493	1493	Yes	The first written and published account of the discovery of the New World; fifteen editions in several languages before the end of the 15th century.	
Columbus	Diario (Note: Spanish for diary, logbook or journal. Also known as: diario de a bordo, diario colombino, diario de Colón.)	Aug 1492 to Mar 1493	?	Yes	First crónica written	
Cortes	Cartas (Note: Spanish for letters. Also known as: cartas de relación.)	?	1519 to 1526	Yes	First crónica on the conquest of the Aztecs	
De Tapia	Relación (Note: Long title: Relación de algunas cosas de las que acaecieron al muy ilustre señor don Hernando Cortés, marqués del Valle, desde que se determinó a ir a descubrir en la Tierra Firme del Mar Océano.)	1539	?	Yes	—N/a	
Diaz de Guzman	La Argentina (Anales del descubrimiento, población y conquista del Río de la Plata)	circa 1612	?	Yes	A mestizo of Spanish and Guaraní descent, considered the first historian born in the Río de la Plata and Paraguay region.	
Diaz del Castillo	Historia verdadera (Note: Long title: Historia verdadera de la conquista de la Nueva España.)	1550 to 1568	1632	Yes	—N/a	
Duran	Historia de las Indias de Nueva España e Islas de Tierra Firme	1576 to 1581	?	Yes	Also known as the Códice Durán; based on oral testimony and indigenous manuscripts in Nahuatl.	
Ercilla	La Araucana	?	1569 to 1589	Yes	First crónica written as an epic poem	
Fernandez de Enciso	Suma (Note: Long title: Suma de geographia.)	?	1519	Yes	First crónica on the continental Indias; first on nautical matters published in Spain	
Fernandez de Oviedo	Sumario (Note: Long title: Sumario de la natural historia de las Indias. Also: De la natural historia de las Indias, De la natural historia de las Indias, o sumario natural.)	Nov 1523 to Apr 1526	Apr 1526	Yes	First crónica on flora or fauna	
Fernandez de Oviedo	Historia (Note: Long title: Historia general y natural de las Indias, islas y tierra firme del mar océano.)	1532 to 1542	?	Yes	First official crónica; first by the cronista de Indias	
Fernandez de Palencia	Primera y segunda parte de la Historia del Perú	?	1571	Yes	An official crónica commissioned by viceroy Andrés Hurtado de Mendoza; withdrawn from circulation shortly after publication for its controversial content.	
Fernandez del Pulgar	Continuation of Herrera y Tordesillas's Décadas	from 1686	never published	?	Cronista mayor de Indias from 1686; an apologetic work aimed against the Spanish Black Legend, unpublished until his death.	
Fuentes y Guzman	Recordación Florida	late 17th century	19th century	Yes	A three-volume crónica by a criollo cronista of Santiago de Guatemala, great-grandson of Bernal Díaz del Castillo; combines the conquest and colonisation of the Kingdom of Guatemala with a detailed geographic, social and economic description; considered the masterwork of Guatemalan criollo historiography.	
Gongora Marmolejo	Historia de todas las cosas que han acaecido en el reino de Chile (Note: Long title: Historia de todas las cosas que han acaecido en el reino de Chile y de los que lo han gobernado (1536-1575).)	1572 to 1575	?	Yes	A soldier under Pedro de Valdivia; valued for its objectivity.	
Grijalva	Itinerario de la armada (Note: Long title: Itinerario de la armada del rey católico a la isla de Yucatán, en la India, en el año de 1518.)	1518	?	Yes	Written by the fleet's chaplain; the earliest direct account of the existence of the Aztec Empire.	
Guaman Poma de Ayala	Primer nueva corónica y buen gobierno	1600 to 1615	?	Yes	A roughly 1,200-page manuscript addressed to King Philip III, combining Spanish and Quechua text with nearly 400 drawings to recount pre-Hispanic Andean history and denounce the abuses of Spanish colonial rule; unknown in the Danish Royal Library until its rediscovery in 1908, it is today considered one of the most important sources on the indigenous perspective of the conquest.	
Gumilla	El Orinoco ilustrado (Note: Long title: El Orinoco ilustrado y defendido.)	35 years of exploration	1741 (expanded 1745)	Yes	A Jesuit missionary who spent 35 years exploring the Orinoco basin; the leading European source on the region until Humboldt's explorations.	
Herrera y Tordesillas	Descripción (Note: Long title: Descripción de las Indias.)	?	1601	No	An official crónica; first by the cronista mayor de Indias	
Herrera y Tordesillas	Décadas (Note: Long title: Historia general de los hechos de los castellanos en las Islas y Tierra Firme del mar Océano que llaman Indias Occidentales.)	1596 to 1615	1601 to 1615	No	An official crónica; second by the cronista mayor de Indias	
Jimenez de Quesada	El Antijovio	?	1567 (posthumous)	Yes	A refutation of the Italian historian Paolo Giovio, written by the founder of the Nuevo Reino de Granada.	
Jimenez de Quesada	Compendio historial	his last years	lost, never published	Yes	A crónica on the conquest of the Nuevo Reino de Granada, now lost; known only through references by other cronistas.	
Landa	Relación (Note: Long title: Relación de las cosas de Yucatán.)	circa 1565 to 1569	1864	Yes	Crónica most representative of those with Maya informants or co-authors	
Lizarraga	Descripción breve de toda la tierra del Perú, Tucumán, Río de la Plata y Chile	late 16th/early 17th century	1908	Yes	A Dominican preacher-general who travelled the territories from Quito to Chile and the Río de la Plata over more than fifty years.	
Lopez de Cogolludo	Historia de Yucatán	1647 to 1656	1688 (posthumous)	?	A Franciscan; combines the military conquest of Yucatán with the evangelising campaign, drawing on the writings of Diego de Landa.	
Lopez de Gomara	Historia general (Note: Long title: Historia general de las Indias y conquista de México.)	circa 1545 to 1552	1552	No	An official crónica	
Lopez de Jerez	Relación (Note: Long title: Relación de Samano. Also: Relación Samano–Xerez.)	late 1527 to early 1528	1844	Yes	First crónica on the conquest of the Inca (Note: Mena's Conquista and Lopez de Jerez's Verdadera relación deemed first in. Lopez de Jerez's Relación deemed first in.)	
Lopez de Jerez	Verdadera relación (Note: Long title: Verdadera relación de la conquista del Perú y provincia del Cuzco, llamada Nueva Castilla.)	Nov 1532 to Jul 1533	Jul 1534	Yes	First crónica on the conquest of the Inca	
Lopez de Velasco	Geografía y descripción universal de las Indias	1571 to 1574	1894	?	A cosmographer and cronista mayor of the Consejo de Indias; kept confidential, it remained unpublished until the 19th century.	
Marino de Lobera	Crónica del Reino de Chile	?	1865	Yes	A soldier in the campaigns of Valdivia, Villagra and García Hurtado de Mendoza; revised and stylised near the end of his life by the Jesuit Bartolomé de Escobar.	
Martyr d'Anghiera	Decades (Note: Long title: De orbe novo decades.)	by 1525	?	No	First official crónica	
Mena	Conquista (Note: Long title: Conquista del Perú, llamada la Nueva Castilla.)	?	early 1534	Yes	First crónica on the conquest of the Inca	
Mendieta	Historia eclesiástica indiana	1571 to 1596	1870	Yes	A Franciscan who lived over fifty years in New Spain; his sharp criticism of colonial rule delayed publication.	
Molina (El Almagrista)	Relación de la conquista y población del Perú	circa 1552	1873 (partial)	Yes	A veteran of the conquest of Peru who accompanied Diego de Almagro to Chile; also known as "Destrucción del Perú".	
Molina (El Cuzqueño)	Relación de las fábulas y ritos de los Incas	probably 1575 to 1583	?	Yes	Commissioned by the bishop of Cuzco; records oral testimony thanks to the author's fluency in Quechua.	
Munoz Camargo	Historia de Tlaxcala	1576 to 1591	?	Yes	A mestizo historian who combined an alphabetic narrative with pictographic sections; presented in person to Philip II in 1585.	
Nunez Cabeza de Vaca	Naufragios y comentarios	?	1542 (expanded 1555)	Yes	The first extensive historical narrative covering the territory of the present-day United States.	
Obregon	Historia de los descubrimientos antiguos y modernos de la Nueva España	1584	1924	Yes	Covers exploratory expeditions in northern New Spain and later incursions towards Nuevo México.	
Oviedo y Banos	Historia de la conquista y población de la Provincia de Venezuela	1705 to 1720	1723	?	Written as an armchair historian rather than as a direct witness to the events described.	
Pane	Relación acerca de las antigüedades de los indios	circa 1498	?	Yes	Considered the first book written on the American continent; records Taíno myths and rites.	
Pigafetta	Relación (Note: Long title: Relación del primer viaje alrededor del mundo.)	1523 to 1524	1524	Yes	First crónica on the Magellan circumnavigation	
Pizarro	Relación del descubrimiento y conquista de los reinos del Perú	completed 1571	?	Yes	A cousin of Francisco Pizarro; provides valuable ethnographic information and a detailed description of Atahualpa.	
Remesal	Historia general de las Indias Occidentales y particular de la gobernación de Chiapa y Guatemala	from 1614	1619	Yes	A Dominican; centres much of the narrative on Bartolomé de las Casas, causing controversy among Guatemalan criollos.	
Rodriguez Freyle	El Carnero	completed 1638	1859	Yes	Recounts a century of the history of present-day Colombia, mixing history with scandalous anecdotes.	
Sahagun	Historia general (Note: Long title: Historia general de las cosas de la Nueva España.)	1547 to 1569	1829 to 1830	Yes	Crónica most representative of those with Mesoamerican informants or co-authors	
Santa Cruz Pachacuti	Relación de antigüedades deste reyno del Pirú	?	1879	Yes	Written by an indigenous nobleman; one of the three great Andean ethnohistorical testimonies by an indigenous author, alongside Guamán Poma.	
Sarmiento de Gamboa	Historia de los Incas	1572	1906	Yes	Commissioned by viceroy Francisco de Toledo; based on interviews with 42 indigenous authorities, intended to justify the conquest.	
Sarmiento de Gamboa	Viaje al Estrecho de Magallanes	1579 to 1580	?	Yes	An account of an expedition to the Strait of Magellan, later used as a basis for attempts to colonise Patagonia.	
Schmidel	Verídica descripción	?	1567 (in German)	Yes	A Bavarian mercenary on Pedro de Mendoza's expedition to the Río de la Plata; recounts the founding of Buenos Aires and Asunción.	
Simon	Noticias historiales de las conquistas de Tierra Firme en las Indias Occidentales	?	1627 (1st part)	Yes	A Franciscan who lived over two decades in the Nuevo Reino de Granada; a demanding critic of other cronistas.	
Solis y Rivadeneyra	Historia (Note: Long title: Historia de la conquista de Mexico, poblacion y progressos de la America septentrional conocida por el nombre de Nueva España.)	early 1660s to May 1683	1684	No	An official crónica	
Tapia	Relación (Note: Long title: Relación de algunas cosas de las que acaecieron al muy ilustre señor don Hernando Cortés, marqués del Valle, desde que se determinó a ir a descubrir en la Tierra Firme del Mar Océano.)	1539	?	Yes	—N/a	
Titu Cusi Yupanqui	Instrucción del Inca Don Diego de Castro Titu Cusi Yupanqui	dictated 1570	?	Yes	The only surviving testimony left by an Inca sovereign on the Spanish conquest and the resistance at Vilcabamba.	
Torquemada	Monarquía Indiana	1592 to 1613	1615	Yes	A Franciscan; based on earlier Franciscan sources, including those of Bernardino de Sahagún.	
Vazquez de Tapia	Relación de méritos y servicios del conquistador Bernardino Vázquez de Tapia	?	?	Yes	A former encomendero and city councillor of Mexico City; combines a military account with legendary elements.	
Vega	Florida (Note: Long title: La Florida del Ynca: historia del adelantado Hernando de Soto, Gouernador y capitan general del Reyno de la Florida, y de otros heroicos caualleros españoles è indios.)	circa 1583 to 1589	early 1605	Yes	First crónica published by an Amerindian or Mestizo author	
Vega	Comentarios Reales de los Incas	?	1609 and 1617	Yes	Combines oral accounts from the author's Cuzco maternal family with Spanish sources; a masterwork of Spanish-American colonial literature.	
Vespucci	Mundus novus	early 1503	Apr 1503	Yes	—N/a	
Vivar	Crónica y relación copiosa y verdadera de los reinos de Chile	completed 1558	1966	Yes	A soldier under Pedro de Valdivia; the earliest extensive account of the conquest of Chile.	
Ximenez	Historia de la provincia de San Vicente de Chiapa y Guatemala	early 18th century	?	Yes	Includes the first transcription and Spanish translation of the Popol Vuh, the sacred text of the Maya-Quiché.	
Zarate	Historia del descubrimiento y conquista del Perú	?	1555	Yes	A royal official, accountant of the Real Hacienda from 1544; a widely cited source, drawn on by the Inca Garcilaso.	
Zorita	Relación de las cosas notables de la Nueva España	circa 1585	mid-19th century	Yes	A jurist who served as oidor in the Audiencias of Santo Domingo, Guatemala and Mexico; idealises pre-Hispanic political organisation.	

== Chroniclers and writings ==
=== General chroniclers and official cosmographers ===
The most prominent chroniclers of this genre include:

- Peter Martyr d'Anghiera (1455–1526)
  - De Orbe Novo ("Decades of the New World"), a work comprising eight decades written in Latin between 1494 and 1526. It compiled oral testimonies and letters from key figures of the exploration and conquest of the Americas, including Christopher Columbus, Hernán Cortés, and Francisco Pizarro. It is considered the first systematic chronicle of the New World, highly valued for its rigorous record of events despite its author never travelling to the Americas.
- Gonzalo Fernández de Oviedo y Valdés (1477–1556)
  - Historia general y natural de las Indias ("General and Natural History of the Indies"), a fifty-volume chronicle based on the author's direct experience as a royal official in the Indies. It combines geography, ethnography, and natural history with the account of the main episodes of the conquest. Only partially published during his lifetime (1535), the complete work was not published until the 19th century.
  - Sumario de la natural historia de las Indias ("Summary of the Natural History of the Indies"), an abbreviated version published in 1526, focusing on the description of the flora, fauna, and indigenous customs of the New World, conceived as a report addressed to Emperor Charles V.
- Bartolomé de las Casas (1474–1566)
  - Memoriales (also known as the memorials of grievances, remedies, and denunciations), early accusatory writings drafted from 1516 onwards and addressed to Cardinal Cisneros and Emperor Charles V. In these texts, Las Casas exposed the abuses committed against the indigenous population and proposed reorganising colonial society into a "republic of Spaniards" (*república de españoles*) and a "republic of Indians" (*república de indios*); they are considered the first chronicle dedicated entirely to the defence of indigenous peoples.
  - Historia de las Indias ("History of the Indies"), a monumental work written between 1527 and 1561 that narrates the general history of the Indies from the first voyage of Christopher Columbus up to 1520. Unlike the Short Account, it offers an extensive and documented narrative based on the author's own experience and on numerous archival sources to which Las Casas had privileged access. By the express wish of the author, it remained unpublished until its first edition was printed between 1875 and 1876.
  - Brevísima relación de la destrucción de las Indias ("A Short Account of the Destruction of the Indies"), a treatise published in 1552 in which Las Casas denounced the atrocities committed by the conquistadors against the indigenous population to influence the Spanish Crown to enact the New Laws. It became one of the primary sources for the so-called Black Legend.
- Francisco López de Gómara (1511–1562)
  - Historia general de las Indias ("General History of the Indies"), a work published in 1552. It is divided into a first part covering the general history of the discovery and a second part focusing on the conquest of Mexico. It was written without the author ever travelling to the Americas, relying instead on contemporary testimonies and documents, including those of Hernán Cortés, to whom Gómara served as chaplain and secretary.
- Antonio de Herrera y Tordesillas (1549–1625)
  - Descripción de las Indias Occidentales ("Description of the West Indies"), a work that served as a geographical introduction to his main chronicle, describing the geography, fauna, and provinces of the Spanish New World.
  - Historia general de los hechos de los castellanos en las Islas y Tierra Firme del mar Océano que llaman Indias Occidentales ("General History of the Deeds of the Castilians in the Islands and Mainland of the Ocean Sea Which Are Called the West Indies"), commonly known as the Décadas de Herrera. It is a chronicle in eight decades and eighty books published between 1601 and 1615 following his appointment as Chief Chronicler of the Indies. It narrates the history of the discovery and conquest of the Americas from 1492 until the mid-16th century. Written entirely from archival sources without the author ever travelling to the American continent, it stands as the most extensive official history of the Indies from the period.
- Juan López de Velasco (1530–1598)
  - Geografía y descripción universal de las Indias ("Geography and Universal Description of the Indies"), a work compiled between 1571 and 1574 by the cosmographer and Chief Chronicler of the Council of the Indies. It systematises geographic, demographic, and administrative information regarding the American territories under Spanish rule. Due to its classified nature, it remained unpublished until its first release in 1894.
- José de Acosta (1540–1600)
  - Historia natural y moral de las Indias ("Natural and Moral History of the Indies"), a treatise published in Seville in 1590. It is divided into two main parts: a "natural" history section dedicated to the geography, fauna, flora, and natural phenomena of the Americas, and a "moral" history section focused on the history, religion, and social institutions of the indigenous peoples of Mexico and Peru. It is considered one of the earliest scientific syntheses on the New World and had a profound influence on contemporary European thought.
- Bernabé Cobo (1580–1657)
  - Historia del Nuevo Mundo ("History of the New World"), an American encyclopaedia in forty-three books, written over forty years (1613–1653) based on the direct experience of the author—a Jesuit priest who lived for more than sixty years between the Viceroyalty of Peru and New Spain. It provides detailed descriptions of the continent's geography, flora, fauna, and natural history, as well as pre-Columbian indigenous cultures, and is considered one of the most comprehensive syntheses of colonial Spanish-American historiography; it was only partially published between 1890 and 1895.
- Martín Fernández de Enciso (c. 1469–1533)
  - Suma de geografía ("Compendium of Geography"), a work published in Seville in 1519, considered the first general geography of the world published in Spanish and the first cosmographic and navigation manual concerning the Indies. It systematically describes the coasts, provinces, and islands of the New World known up to that date, while also addressing the art of navigation.
- Pedro Fernández del Pulgar (1621–1697)
  - Various letters and reports on voyages to the Indies: as Chief Chronicler of the Indies from 1686, Fernández del Pulgar undertook the continuation of Antonio de Herrera y Tordesillas's Décadas, extending the historical narrative up to 1584 and submitting his four-volume work to the Council of the Indies. Envisioned as an all-encompassing history with an apologetic stance against the Black Legend, the work remained unpublished at the time of his death.

=== New Spain (Mexico) ===
- Andrés de Tapia (c. 1497–1561)
  - Relación de algunas cosas que acaecieron al muy ilustre señor Don Hernando Cortés ("Account of Some Things That Happened to the Very Illustrious Lord Don Hernando Cortés"), a chronicle written by one of Hernán Cortés's captains during the conquest of Mexico. An eyewitness to major events such as La Noche Triste and the fall of Tenochtitlan, his work is considered one of the most valuable firsthand soldier accounts of the conquest, alongside those of Bernal Díaz del Castillo and Cortés himself.
- Francisco de Aguilar (1479–1571)
  - Relación breve de la conquista de la Nueva España ("Brief Account of the Conquest of New Spain"), a chronicle dictated around 1560 when the author—a former soldier of Hernán Cortés who became a Dominican friar—was over eighty years old. It offers a sober and providentialist account of the conquest of Mexico based on his direct experience as an eyewitness.
- Francisco Cervantes de Salazar (c. 1514–1575)
  - Crónica de la Nueva España ("Chronicle of New Spain"), a work commissioned in 1558 upon his appointment as official chronicler of Mexico City. It combines the narrative of the conquest with a detailed geographical, institutional, and social description of mid-16th-century New Spain. The manuscript remained unpublished until 1914.
- Juan de Grijalva (1490–1527)
  - Itinerario de la armada del rey católico a la isla de Yucatán, en la India, en el año de 1518 ("Itinerary of the Fleet of the Catholic King to the Island of Yucatán, in the Indies, in the Year 1518"), an account of the reconnaissance expedition along the coasts of Yucatán, Tabasco, and Veracruz conducted in 1518 under Grijalva's command, penned by the fleet's chief chaplain (likely Juan Díaz). It provides the first direct European record of the existence of the Aztec Empire and served as a foundation for the subsequent expedition led by Hernán Cortés.
- Hernán Cortés (1485–1547)
  - Cartas de relación ("Letters of Relation"), a series of five letters addressed to Emperor Charles V between 1519 and 1526. In them, Cortés provides a first-person account of the conquest of Mexico, from his arrival on the coast of Yucatán to the consolidation of New Spain. They constitute the most direct and influential primary source on the conquest process.
- Bernardino de Sahagún (c. 1499–1590)
  - Historia general de las cosas de la Nueva España ("General History of the Things of New Spain"), an encyclopaedic work compiled over several decades using testimonies from Nahua indigenous informants. It documents the religion, social organization, natural history, and daily life of pre-Columbian Mexico. Preserved primarily in the bilingual manuscript known as the Florentine Codex, it is considered a foundational text of modern ethnography.
- Bernal Díaz del Castillo (c. 1496–1584)
  - Historia verdadera de la conquista de la Nueva España ("The True History of the Conquest of New Spain"), a chronicle written by a veteran soldier of Hernán Cortés's expedition. It was written in response to accounts by other chroniclers—particularly Francisco López de Gómara—whom Díaz considered inaccurate and unfair to the common soldiers. Published posthumously in 1632, it remains one of the most widely cited primary sources on the conquest of Mexico due to its vivid first-hand detail.
- Bernardino Vázquez de Tapia (c. 1493–1559)
  - Relación de méritos y servicios del conquistador Bernardino Vázquez de Tapia ("Account of Merits and Services of the Conquistador Bernardino Vázquez de Tapia"), an autobiographical petition in which the author—a former encomendero and councilman of Mexico City—sought recognition for his service during the siege and fall of Tenochtitlan following the abolition of the encomienda system. It combines military narrative with legendary elements, such as the reported apparition of Saint James the Apostle at the Battle of Centla.
- Toribio de Benavente "Motolinía" (c. 1482–1569)
  - Historia de los Indios de la Nueva España ("History of the Indians of New Spain"), written around 1541 by one of the Twelve Apostles of Mexico who arrived in 1524. It describes the indigenous religious beliefs, rites, and customs before and after the conquest, as well as the process of evangelisation. It serves as an important early ethnographic source, though it is marked by Motolinía's defence of Franciscan missionary methods against the critiques of Bartolomé de las Casas.
- Diego de Landa (1524–1579)
  - Relación de las cosas de Yucatán ("Account of the Things of Yucatán"), written around 1566 after Landa's return to Spain. It details the language, writing system, calendar, and customs of the Yucatec Maya. Although Landa had previously ordered the destruction of numerous Maya codices during his evangelisation campaigns, his Relación unexpectedly proved essential in the 20th-century decipherment of the Maya hieroglyphic script.
- Diego López de Cogolludo (1613–1665)
  - Historia de Yucatán ("History of Yucatán"), a chronicle written between 1647 and 1656 by this Franciscan friar and published posthumously in Madrid in 1688. It combines an account of the Spanish conquest of Yucatán—led by Francisco de Montejo—with a detailed record of Franciscan missionary efforts. The work draws on earlier sources, including the manuscripts of Diego de Landa.
- Diego Durán (1537–c. 1588)
  - Historia de las Indias de Nueva España e Islas de Tierra Firme ("History of the Indies of New Spain and Islands of the Mainland"), a Dominican chronicle written between 1576 and 1581 based on oral testimonies and Nahuatl pictorial manuscripts. It details the mythical migration of the Mexica from Aztlán, as well as their pre-Columbian history, religion, and ritual calendar. Also known as the Durán Codex, it is one of the richest ethnohistorical sources on Mexica civilization.
- Juan de Torquemada (c. 1562–1624)
  - Monarquía Indiana ("Indian Monarchy"), a three-part Franciscan work compiled between 1592 and 1613 and published in Seville in 1615. It addresses the origins, history, institutions, religion, and customs of the pre-Columbian peoples of central Mexico, as well as the process of Christian evangelisation. Drawing extensively on earlier Franciscan accounts, including those of Bernardino de Sahagún, it became a cornerstone text for subsequent Mexican historiography.
- Baltasar de Obregón (b. 1544)
  - Historia de los descubrimientos antiguos y modernos de la Nueva España ("History of the Ancient and Modern Discoveries of New Spain"), a two-book chronicle written in Mexico City in 1584. It narrates the exploratory and military expeditions into northern New Spain, including those led by Francisco de Ibarra, as well as subsequent incursions into New Mexico. The text remained unpublished until its discovery in the General Archive of the Indies and subsequent publication in 1924.
- Gerónimo de Mendieta (1525–1604)
  - Historia eclesiástica indiana ("Indian Ecclesiastical History"), a chronicle written between 1571 and 1596 by this Franciscan friar who resided in New Spain for over fifty years. Dedicated to the history of Franciscan evangelisation and the biographies of early missionaries, its harsh critique of the Spanish colonial administration prevented its publication until 1870.
- Hernando Alvarado Tezozómoc (c. 1525–c. 1610)
  - Crónica Mexicana ("Mexican Chronicle"), a work written in Spanish around 1598 by this grandson of Moctezuma II, who served as an official Nahuatl interpreter for the Real Audiencia of Mexico. It details the history of the Mexica from their mythical migration to the Spanish conquest, drawing on oral tradition and pre-Columbian pictographical codices; it remained unpublished until 1878.
- Fernando de Alva Ixtlilxóchitl (c. 1578–1648)
  - Historia de la nación chichimeca ("History of the Chichimeca Nation"), a work completed around 1640 by this Mestizo chronicler, a descendant of the rulers of Acolhuacan and Tenochtitlan. It narrates the history of the Chichimeca lineage from Xolotl down to Nezahualcoyotl and Nezahualpilli, as well as the Siege of Tenochtitlan, offering a pro-Texcoco perspective on the conquest. It relies on ancient pictographic codices and the oral tradition of the indigenous nobility.
- Diego Muñoz Camargo (c. 1529–1599)
  - Historia de Tlaxcala ("History of Tlaxcala"), a hybrid work compiled between 1576 and 1591 by this Mestizo historian, son of a Spanish conquistador and a noble Tlaxcaltec woman. It combines an extensive alphabetical narrative with pictographic sections to document the religious, political, and military history of the Tlaxcaltec people before and after the Spanish conquest. The author presented it personally to King Philip II in Madrid in 1585.
- Alonso de Zorita (c. 1512–c. 1585)
  - Relación de las cosas notables de la Nueva España ("Account of the Notable Things of New Spain"), a questionnaire-structured work written around 1585 by this jurist who served as an oidor (judge) in the Audiencias of Santo Domingo, Guatemala, and Mexico. It idealises pre-Columbian political and social organization as a model of good governance in contrast to colonial abuses, serving as a vital primary source for pre-conquest indigenous institutions. The text was only published in print in the mid-19th century.
- Antonio de Solís y Ribadeneyra (1610–1686)
  - Historia de la conquista de México ("History of the Conquest of Mexico"), an official chronicle on which the author worked for over two decades following his appointment as Chief Chronicler of the Indies in 1661, until its publication in 1684. It narrates the conquest of Mexico based on earlier accounts by Hernán Cortés, Francisco López de Gómara, and Bernal Díaz del Castillo. Written in the erudite, elegant style of the Spanish Baroque, it became a bestseller across Europe despite its author never travelling to the Americas.

=== The Caribbean, North America, and early voyages ===
- Christopher Columbus (1451–1506)
  - Diario de a bordo ("Logbook of the First Voyage"), the navigation log kept during his first transatlantic voyage (1492–1493). The original manuscript was lost, but its contents survive through the summary and partial transcriptions made by Bartolomé de las Casas in his Historia de las Indias. It provides a day-by-day account of the crossing, the first sighting of land, and initial encounters with the Taíno peoples of the Antilles.
  - Letter to Luis de Santángel, a missive written in February 1493 announcing the discovery of the New World. It became an immediate publishing success, going through fifteen editions in several languages before the end of the 15th century. Together with subsequent letters addressed to the Catholic Monarchs, it constitutes the earliest written and published record of the existence of the Americas.
- Ramón Pané (d. c. 1539)
  - Relación acerca de las antigüedades de los indios ("Account of the Antiquities of the Indians"), a work written around 1498 at the request of Christopher Columbus, following Pané's years living among the Taíno of Hispaniola to learn their language. Considered the first book written in a European language in the Americas, it records the myths, religious beliefs, and ritual practices of the Taíno people prior to their collapse.
- Diego Álvarez Chanca (fl. 1480–1515)
  - Carta al cabildo de Sevilla ("Letter to the City Council of Seville"), an account written in 1494 by this Sevillian physician who participated in the second voyage of Columbus. The letter describes the transatlantic crossing, the newly encountered islands of the eastern Caribbean, the regional flora and fauna, and early contacts with the Carib peoples; it stands as one of the earliest European primary sources on the Antillean region.
- Álvar Núñez Cabeza de Vaca (c. 1490–1559)
  - Naufragios ("Shipwrecks"), an account published in 1542 (expanded in 1555 as Naufragios y comentarios) detailing the author's ordeal following the shipwreck of Pánfilo de Narváez's expedition to Florida. It recounts his subsequent journey on foot across what is now the southern United States and northern Mexico until reuniting with Spanish forces in New Spain. It is considered the first extensive historical narrative set within the territory of the modern United States.
- Amerigo Vespucci (1454–1512)
  - Mundus Novus, a letter written in early 1503 to his former patron Lorenzo di Pierfrancesco de' Medici, in which Vespucci recounts his third voyage along the coast of South America. In it, he clearly articulates for the first time the concept that the lands encountered by Europeans formed a separate continent rather than an eastern extension of Asia. Published that same year in numerous European editions and translations, the text gained immense popularity and contributed directly to the naming of the new continent as "America" in his honour.
- Antonio Pigafetta (c. 1491–1531)
  - Relazzione del primo viaggio intorno al mondo ("Report on the First Voyage Around the World"), a chronicle written between 1523 and 1524 by this Italian nobleman who joined Ferdinand Magellan's expedition as a supercargo, becoming one of the eighteen survivors who completed the first circumnavigation of the globe. It provides a detailed account of the voyage, the passage through the Strait of Magellan, the arrival in the Philippines, and Magellan's death on the island of Mactan. The original Italian manuscript was lost, and the text first became known in Europe through a condensed French translation published in 1525.

=== Central America (Guatemala and Chiapas) ===
- Antonio de Remesal (1570–1619)
  - Historia general de las Indias Occidentales y particular de la gobernación de Chiapa y Guatemala ("General History of the West Indies and Particular History of the Governance of Chiapa and Guatemala"), a Dominican chronicle published in Madrid in 1619. Written from 1614 following the author's arrival in Guatemala, it narrates the conquest and colonisation of Central America, focusing significantly on the figure of Bartolomé de las Casas and the activities of the Dominican Order. Its publication sparked intense controversy among Guatemalan criollos, who considered it defamatory.
- Francisco Ximénez (1666–c. 1729)
  - Historia de la provincia de San Vicente de Chiapa y Guatemala ("History of the Province of San Vicente de Chiapa and Guatemala"), a Dominican chronicle written in the early 18th century by this friar, who mastered the K'iche' Maya language. The work included the first transcription and Spanish translation of the Popol Vuh, the sacred text of the K'iche' people, which Ximénez discovered and copied while serving as parish priest of Chichicastenango; his work effectively saved one of the most vital surviving texts of Maya literature from extinction.
- Francisco Antonio de Fuentes y Guzmán (1643–1700)
  - Recordación Florida ("Florid Recollection"), a three-volume chronicle written at the end of the 17th century by this Criollo chronicler from Santiago de Guatemala, a great-grandson of Bernal Díaz del Castillo. It combines the history of the conquest and colonisation of the Kingdom of Guatemala with a detailed geographical, social, and economic description of the territory. The work remained unpublished until the 19th century and is considered a masterpiece of Guatemalan Criollo historiography.

=== Peru ===
- Miguel Cabello de Balboa (1535–1608)
  - Miscelánea Antártica ("Antarctic Miscellany"), a chronicle begun around 1576 in Quito and completed in 1586. It weaves together Biblical and European history with Inca history, ranging from the Creation to the death of Atahualpa in 1532, and includes the foundational Naymlap legend regarding the origins of the northern coastal peoples of Peru.
  - Verdadera descripción y relación larga de la Provincia y Tierra de las Esmeraldas ("True Description and Extended Account of the Province and Land of Esmeraldas"), a manuscript written in 1583 documenting the 1577 expedition to evangelise the indigenous and Afro-descendant communities of the Esmeraldas region (present-day Ecuador), as well as efforts to establish an overland trade route connecting Quito to the Pacific coast.
- Pedro Cieza de León (c. 1520–1554)
  - Crónica del Perú ("Chronicle of Peru"), a four-part work based on the author's direct experience as a soldier in South America and on oral testimonies gathered from quipucamayocs (Inca record-keepers). The first part, published in Seville in 1553, describes the geography, flora, fauna, and the founding of major Spanish cities in the region, while the remaining parts, dedicated to Inca governance and the civil wars among the conquistadors, remained unpublished until the 19th and 20th centuries.
- Diego Fernández de Palencia (c. 1520–c. 1581)
  - Primera y segunda parte de la Historia del Perú ("First and Second Parts of the History of Peru"), an official chronicle commissioned by Viceroy Andrés Hurtado de Mendoza and published in Seville in 1571. It narrates the rebellions of Gonzalo Pizarro and Francisco Hernández Girón, as well as the pacification of the viceroyalty led by Pedro de la Gasca. Its highly controversial nature led the authorities to suppress the work shortly after its publication.
- Inca Garcilaso de la Vega (1539–1616)
  - La Florida del Inca ("The Florida of the Inca"), a chronicle published in 1605, written between 1583 and 1589 based on oral accounts provided by a survivor of the expedition. It details the failed Spanish attempt to conquer Florida led by Hernando de Soto between 1539 and 1543. Combining historical narrative with a polished literary style, it is widely considered the first published work by a Mestizo author.
  - Comentarios Reales de los Incas ("Real Commentaries of the Incas"), a two-part work published in 1609 and 1617. Written by the foremost early chronicler of mixed Inca and Spanish heritage, it combines oral traditions from his maternal Cuzqueño noble family with European sources to document the history, culture, and governance of the Inca Empire before and after the Spanish conquest. It is regarded as one of the masterpieces of Hispanic American colonial literature.
- Cristóbal de Molina ("El Cuzqueño") (1529–1585)
  - Relación de las fábulas y ritos de los incas ("Account of the Fables and Rites of the Incas"), a work commissioned by Sebastián de Lartaún, Bishop of Cuzco, and compiled between 1575 and 1583. Drawing on the author's fluency in Quechua, it records oral testimonies from direct witnesses of the religious rites and ceremonies of the Inca Empire, forming a primary source for pre-Columbian Andean religion.
- Cristóbal de Molina ("El Almagrista") (1494, Leganiel – 1580, Santiago)
  - Relación de la conquista y población del Perú ("Account of the Conquest and Settlement of Peru"), a chronicle written around 1552 by this priest, a veteran of the conquest of Peru who accompanied Diego de Almagro on his expedition to Chile. Also known as Destrucción del Perú ("Destruction of Peru"), it was first partially published in 1873. It represents an important early account of the conquest, though its exact attribution has occasionally been a subject of historiographical debate.
- Pedro Sarmiento de Gamboa (1532–1592)
  - History of the Incas (Historia de los Incas), a chronicle commissioned by Viceroy Francisco de Toledo and compiled in Cuzco in 1572. Based on interviews with forty-two indigenous leaders and testimonies from surviving conquistadors, it was intended to demonstrate the tyrannical nature of Inca rule to legitimize Spanish dominion. The manuscript remained unknown for centuries until its rediscovery and publication in 1906.
  - Viaje al Estrecho de Magallanes ("Voyage to the Strait of Magellan"), an official account of the exploratory expedition through the Strait of Magellan conducted between 1579 and 1580 by order of the Viceroy of Peru. Sarmiento de Gamboa details the geography and climate of Southern Patagonia, providing the foundation for subsequent Spanish attempts to colonise the strait.
- Juan de Betanzos (1519–1576)
  - Suma y narración de los incas ("Sum and Narrative of the Incas"), a chronicle completed in 1551 by order of Viceroy Antonio de Mendoza. The author, who served as an official interpreter for Francisco Pizarro, married an Inca noblewoman previously betrothed to Atahualpa, granting him unique access to oral traditions from the Cuzqueño nobility. The manuscript remained mostly unpublished until a partial edition appeared in 1880.
- Felipe Guamán Poma de Ayala (c. 1535–c. 1616)
  - El primer nueva corónica y buen gobierno ("First New Chronicle and Good Government"), a manuscript of nearly 1,200 pages written between 1600 and 1615 and addressed to King Philip III. It combines Spanish and Quechua text with almost 400 full-page line drawings to detail pre-Columbian Andean history and denounce the abuses of Spanish colonial rule. Lost for centuries, it was rediscovered in 1908 in the Royal Danish Library and is now recognized as one of the most critical primary sources on the indigenous perspective of the conquest.
- Antonio de la Calancha (1584–1654)
  - Crónica moralizada del orden de San Agustín en el Perú ("Moralised Chronicle of the Order of Saint Augustine in Peru"), a historiographical and religious work published in Barcelona in 1638. Written at the behest of his Augustinian superiors, it combines the history of the Order of Saint Augustine in the Viceroyalty of Peru with a providentialist and moral interpretation of events, incorporating descriptions of pre-Columbian indigenous religious practices and key episodes of the conquest. It is considered the premier chronicle of the Augustinian Order in South America.
- Francisco de Jerez (1497–1565)
  - Verdadera relación de la conquista del Perú ("True Account of the Conquest of Peru"), a chronicle published in Seville in 1534 by the official secretary of Francisco Pizarro. As an eyewitness to the capture of Atahualpa at Cajamarca and the subsequent division of his ransom, Jerez provided what is considered the first official chronicle of the Spanish conquest of Peru; it was quickly translated into Italian and circulated widely across Europe.
  - Relación Sámano-Xerez ("Sámano-Xerez Account"), a report compiled in late 1527 or early 1528 following the return to Panama of the initial reconnaissance expedition led by Francisco Pizarro and Diego de Almagro along the South American Pacific coast. Partially attributed to Jerez, it represents the earliest known written testimony confirming the existence of the Inca Empire, though it remained unpublished until 1844.
- Agustín de Zárate (c. 1514–c. 1585)
  - Historia del descubrimiento y conquista del Perú ("History of the Discovery and Conquest of Peru"), a work published in Antwerp in 1555. Written by a royal official who traveled to Peru in 1544 as accountant for the Royal Treasury, it reflects his firsthand experience during the civil wars between the encomenderos and the viceroy. The chronicle covers the early years of the conquest up to the death of Gonzalo Pizarro in 1548 and became one of the most widely cited sources of the period, utilized extensively by Inca Garcilaso de la Vega.
- Pedro Pizarro (1515–1587)
  - Relación del descubrimiento y conquista de los reinos del Perú ("Account of the Discovery and Conquest of the Kingdoms of Peru"), a chronicle completed in 1571. Written by a cousin of Francisco Pizarro who arrived in Peru in 1531 as the conquistador's page, he participated in key military campaigns against Manco Inca. In addition to its military account, it offers valuable ethnographic observations on daily Andean life and a detailed personal description of Atahualpa.+
- Gaspar de Carvajal (c. 1500–1584)
  - Relación del nuevo descubrimiento del famoso río Grande de las Amazonas ("Account of the New Discovery of the Famous Great River of the Amazons"), a chronicle written by this Dominican friar who accompanied Francisco de Orellana in 1541 on the expedition that followed the Napo River down to the mouth of the Amazon River, becoming the first Europeans to traverse the river's length. As an eyewitness and survivor, Carvajal describes the indigenous riverine societies and the legendary encounter with female warriors that gave the river its name. The text remained unpublished until 1894.
- Reginaldo de Lizárraga (1545–1615)
  - Descripción breve de toda la tierra del Perú, Tucumán, Río de la Plata y Chile ("Brief Description of All the Land of Peru, Tucumán, Río de la Plata, and Chile"), a travel narrative compiled in the late 16th and early 17th centuries by this Dominican friar, who traveled extensively as a preacher general across territories stretching from Quito to Chile and the Río de la Plata. Written in an informal, direct tone, it details geography, urban settlements, and regional customs based on over fifty years of personal experience in the Americas; it remained unpublished until 1908.

=== Chile ===
- Jerónimo de Vivar (born c. 1524/1525)
  - Crónica y relación copiosa y verdadera de los reinos de Chile ("Copious and True Chronicle and Account of the Kingdoms of Chile"), a manuscript completed in 1558 by a soldier who accompanied Pedro de Valdivia during the conquest of Chile. It is considered the first extensive narrative on the subject; it remained lost until its discovery in the mid-20th century and subsequent publication in 1966.
- Pedro Mariño de Lobera (1528–1594)
  - Crónica del Reino de Chile ("Chronicle of the Kingdom of Chile"), a work compiled by this Galician soldier who participated in the military campaigns of Pedro de Valdivia, Francisco de Villagra, and García Hurtado de Mendoza. Entrusted towards the end of his life to the Jesuit priest Bartolomé de Escobar for revision and stylistic refinement, it is notable among Chilean chronicles for its frequent inclusion of extraordinary and supernatural occurrences. The manuscript remained unpublished until 1865.
- Alonso de Góngora Marmolejo (1524–1576)
  - Historia de todas las cosas que han acaecido en el reino de Chile y de los que lo han gobernado: (1536–1575) ("History of All Things That Have Occurred in the Kingdom of Chile and of Those Who Have Governed It"), a chronicle compiled between 1572 and 1575 by a soldier who fought alongside Pedro de Valdivia. Serving as an eyewitness to the events he narrates from the arrival of Spanish forces in Santiago in 1541 through the end of Melchor Bravo de Saravia's governorship, his account is praised for its historical objectivity and is preserved in a manuscript at the Royal Academy of History in Madrid.
- Alonso de Ercilla (1533–1594)
  - La Araucana, an epic poem in thirty-seven cantos published in three parts between 1569 and 1589. Written by a soldier and poet who spent seventeen months active in military campaigns against the Mapuche during the Arauco War, it depicts the conflicts between Spanish forces and the indigenous inhabitants, granting the Mapuche an unusually sympathetic and collective heroic status for classical epic poetry. It is considered a foundational work of Chilean literature and one of the major epic poems of the Spanish Golden Age.

=== Venezuela and New Kingdom of Granada ===
- Pedro de la Cadena (1542–1607)
  - Los actos y hazañas valerosas del capitán Diego Hernández de Serpa ("The Valorous Acts and Deeds of Captain Diego Hernández de Serpa"), an epic poem in ottava rima written between 1563 and 1564 celebrating the military deeds of Diego Hernández de Serpa, a key figure in the Spanish conquest of New Andalusia (present-day eastern Venezuela). It is considered the earliest poem on a Venezuelan subject and possibly the oldest poem written in a European language in the Americas.
- Jacinto de Carvajal (c. 1587–1648)
  - Relación del descubrimiento del río Apure hasta su ingreso en el Orinoco ("Account of the Discovery of the Apure River to Its Inflow into the Orinoco"), a chronicle published in 1648 by the Dominican friar Jacinto de Carvajal. It details a reconnaissance expedition along the Apure River to its confluence with the Orinoco River in modern-day Venezuela, providing extensive geographical and ethnographic documentation on the indigenous peoples of the Llanos region.
- Pedro Simón (1574–c. 1628)
  - Noticias historiales de las conquistas de Tierra Firme en las Indias Occidentales ("Historical News of the Conquests of Tierra Firme in the West Indies"), a Franciscan chronicle whose first part was published in 1627. It details the Spanish conquest and colonisation of the territories of modern Colombia and Venezuela. Having lived in the New Kingdom of Granada for over two decades, the author stood out for his critical approach toward earlier chroniclers and his commitment to verifying events through personal observation and local interviews.
- Juan de Castellanos (1522–1607)
  - Elegías de varones ilustres de Indias ("Elegies of Illustrious Men of the Indies"), an epic poem written in ottava rima comprising over 113,000 lines—making it the longest poem written in the Spanish language. It narrates the primary events of the discovery and conquest of the Antilles, Venezuela, and the New Kingdom of Granada; only the first of its four parts was published during the author's lifetime (in 1589).
- José de Oviedo y Baños (1671–1738)
  - Historia de la conquista y población de la Provincia de Venezuela ("History of the Conquest and Settlement of the Province of Venezuela"), a work published in Madrid in 1723 and compiled between 1705 and 1720 using official archives and earlier chronicles. It narrates the conquest and settlement of present-day Venezuela from the arrival of Christopher Columbus through the late 16th century. Unlike earlier eyewitness chroniclers, Oviedo y Baños wrote as an armchair historian, employing a refined narrative style that distinguished his work from earlier epic accounts.
- Joseph Luis de Cisneros (fl. mid-18th century)
  - Descripción exacta de la provincia de Venezuela ("Exact Description of the Province of Venezuela"), a work published in 1764 commissioned by the Royal Guipuzcoan Company of Caracas. It describes the geography, economy, and major urban centers of the province—including Caracas, Valencia, Barquisimeto, Coro, and Trujillo—serving as a key primary source on Venezuelan trade and society on the eve of independence.
- Joseph Gumilla (1686–1750)
  - El Orinoco ilustrado y defendido ("The Orinoco Illustrated and Defended"), a work published in Madrid in 1741 and reissued in an expanded edition in 1745. The result of thirty-five years spent by this Jesuit missionary exploring the Orinoco River basin, it documents the geography, flora, fauna, and indigenous ethnography of the region, becoming the primary European source of knowledge on the area until the expeditions of Alexander von Humboldt half a century later.
- Juan Rodríguez Freyle (1566–1642)
  - El Carnero, a chronicle originally titled Conquista y descubrimiento del Nuevo Reino de Granada... ("Conquest and Discovery of the New Kingdom of Granada..."), completed in 1638. It covers a century of history in the territory of present-day Colombia, from the founding of Santafé de Bogotá to the author's own era, blending historical narrative with local gossip, scandalous anecdotes, and colorful accounts of early colonial society; it remained unpublished until its first printed edition in 1859.
- Gonzalo Jiménez de Quesada (1509–1579)
  - El Antijovio ("The Anti-Giovio"), a work written around 1567 by the conquistador and founder of the New Kingdom of Granada. It was composed as a direct refutation of the Italian historian Paolo Giovio, who had criticized the actions and conduct of Spanish troops during the Italian Wars.
  - Compendio historial ("Historical Compendium"), a lost chronicle detailing the conquest of the New Kingdom of Granada, composed during the author's final years in retirement at Suesca. Though no manuscript survives, its contents are known through extensive citations and references in the works of later chroniclers such as Juan de Castellanos.
- Pedro de Aguado (1538-después de 1589)
  - Recopilación historial de Venezuela, crónica escrita entre 1575 y 1578 tras el regreso del autor a España, fraile franciscano que había pasado más de quince años como misionero en el Nuevo Reino de Granada; incorpora también testimonios del franciscano Antonio de Medrano y narra los acontecimientos ocurridos entre 1524 y 1569 en los actuales territorios de Colombia y Venezuela; permaneció inédita hasta el siglo XX.

=== Río de la Plata y Paraguay ===
- Ulrico Schmidel (c. 1510-1580)
  - Verídica descripción, relato publicado en alemán en 1567 por este soldado y mercenario bávaro que participó en la expedición de Pedro de Mendoza al Río de la Plata en 1534 y permaneció veinte años en la región; narra la fundación de Buenos Aires y Asunción y las penurias de los primeros colonos, constituyendo una de las primeras crónicas sobre los territorios de las actuales Argentina y Paraguay escrita por un cronista no español.
- Ruy Díaz de Guzmán (c. 1559-1629)
  - La Argentina (Anales del descubrimiento, población y conquista del Río de la Plata), crónica concluida hacia 1612 por este mestizo hispano-guaraní, nieto del gobernador Domingo Martínez de Irala, considerado el primer historiador nacido en el territorio del Río de la Plata y el Paraguay; narra la exploración y colonización de la región desde el descubrimiento hasta la fundación de Santa Fe en 1573, combinando el relato histórico con episodios legendarios de tradición oral y familiar.

== See also ==
- Crónica – on Spanish chronicles as literary works
- Cronista – on European chroniclers in general
- Iberian cartography, 1400–1600
- Historiography of Spanish America

== Notes and references ==
=== References ===
1. Iwasaki F (2021). "Crónicas y cronistas de Indias". Centro Andaluz de las Letras. OCLC 1381455773.
2. "Diccionario biográfico electrónico". Historia hispánica. 2018. OCLC 1076520403.
3. Fernandez Lopez J. "Cronistas de Indias". Hispanoteca.
4. Kohut K (2009). "Las primeras crónicas de Indias y la teoría historiográfica". Colonial Latin American Review. 18 (2): 153–187. doi:10.1080/10609160903080188.
5. Gonzalez Boixo JC (1999). "Hacia una definición de las crónicas de Indias". Anales de Literatura Hispanoamericana. 28 (1): 227–237. ISSN 0210-4547.
