= Crónica =

Crónica may refer to:

- Crónica (newspaper), Buenos Aires newspaper
- Crónica Electrónica or Crónica, independent media label based in Porto, Portugal
- Crónica TV, Argentine news cable channel
- Crônica, Portuguese-language form of short writings about daily topics, published in newspaper or magazine columns
- Crónica (literary genre), Spanish Latin-American literary style
  - Crónica de Indias, a type of crónica

== See also ==
- La Crónica de Hoy, Mexican newspaper
- Cronaca Vera, Italian tabloid news magazine
- Chronic (disambiguation)
- Chronicle (disambiguation)
