= David Kronick =

David Kronick may refer to:

- David A. Kronick (1917–2006), American librarian
- David C. Kronick (born 1932), American politician in New Jersey
