= Kronick =

Kronick is a surname. Notable people with the surname include:

- David A. Kronick (1917–2006), American librarian
- David C. Kronick (b. 1932), New Jersey politician
- Maury Kaye (b. Morris Kronick) (1932–1983), Canadian jazz pianist
- Richard Kronick, American medical professor
- William Kronick (b. 1934), American filmmaker

== See also ==
- Kronic
- Kronik
