= Cronica =

Cronica may refer to:

- cronica, old Italian word for chronicle (modern Italian cronaca)
- simplified spelling of Spanish crónica (disambiguation)
- The Nuova Cronica ('New Chronicles') by the 14th-century Italian chronicler Giovanni Villani
