= Relación acerca de las antigüedades de los indios =

Early ethnographic account of Macorix religion by Ramón Pané

- Author: Ramón Pané
- Original title: Relación de fray Ramón acerca de las antigüedades de los indios
- Language: Spanish
- Subject: Taíno religion
- Genre: Ethnography, Spanish colonial literature
- Published: c. 1498
- Publication place: Crown of Castile

The Relación acerca de las antigüedades de los indios (“Account of the Antiquities of the Indians”) is an early ethnographic text describing the religious beliefs, myths, and ritual practices of the Macorix people living on the island of Hispaniola (present-day Dominican Republic and Haiti). The work was written around 1498 by the Jeronymite friar Ramón Pané, who lived among Indigenous communities under orders from Christopher Columbus.

The text is widely regarded as the earliest ethnographic account written by a European in the Americas. Pané learned the Indigenous Macorix language language of Hispaniola and gathered information directly from Macorix and Taíno informants, making the work a key source for the reconstruction of Taíno mythology and religion.

== Historical context ==
The Relación was composed in the context of the second voyage of Christopher Columbus (1493–1496) and the early Spanish colonial presence in the Caribbean. During this period the Crown of Castile began establishing administrative structures in Hispaniola while also promoting missionary activity among Indigenous populations.

Columbus commissioned Ramón Pané to reside among the Macorix in order to learn their language and document their religious beliefs. The purpose of the project was partly ethnographic but primarily missionary, since knowledge of Indigenous religious practices was considered necessary for the process of Christian evangelization.

Modern scholarship considers Pané's account one of the earliest attempts to describe Indigenous Caribbean belief systems using direct observation and oral testimony. Archaeologists and historians of the Caribbean have therefore relied heavily on the text for reconstructing Taíno religious traditions and cosmology.

== Textual transmission ==
The original manuscript of Pané's work has not survived. The text is known through several sixteenth-century editorial traditions. The earliest known version is the Italian translation included by Peter Martyr d'Anghiera in his Decades of the New World (De Orbe Novo), first published in 1511.

Another important textual witness appears in Bartolomé de las Casas’s Historia de las Indias, where the Dominican chronicler reproduced and adapted parts of Pané's narrative.

The text also circulated in Italian compilations associated with the humanist Alfonso de Ulloa, which helped disseminate the account in early European collections describing the Americas.

Because of this complex editorial history, modern editions rely on philological comparison of these printed witnesses. The most influential critical reconstruction was produced by the Cuban scholar José Juan Arrom.

== Purpose ==
In the prologue to the work, Pané explained the aim of his account:

Yo, fray Ramón, pobre ermitaño de la Orden de San Jerónimo, por mandato del ilustre señor Almirante y virrey y gobernador de las Islas y de la Tierra Firme de las Indias, escribo lo que he podido aprender y saber de las creencias e idolatrías de los indios, y de cómo veneran a sus dioses.

I, Fray Ramon, poor hermit of the Order of Saint Jerome, by order of the illustrious Admiral, Viceroy and Governor of the Isles and Mainland of The Indies, have written that which I could learn and know of the beliefs and idolatries of the Indians, and how they worship their gods.

== Content ==
The Relación describes numerous aspects of Taíno religion and cosmology. Pané records the names of deities, mythological narratives concerning the origins of the sun, moon, and sea, and ritual practices associated with cemíes, sacred objects believed to embody spiritual beings.

The work also discusses the role of the behiques, ritual specialists responsible for healing, divination, and ceremonial activities. In addition, Pané recorded myths concerning the origin of the sun and moon, the creation of the sea, beliefs about the dead, and other elements of Macorix oral tradition.

== Modern editions ==
The most influential modern critical edition was prepared by the Cuban philologist José Juan Arrom, who reconstructed the text through systematic comparison of the traditions preserved by Peter Martyr and Las Casas.

== Textual criticism and scholarly debate ==
Scholars have long discussed the reliability and textual reconstruction of Pané's account. Maarten Jansen has argued that Arrom's reconstruction depends heavily on the version transmitted by Bartolomé de las Casas, and that certain linguistic normalizations introduced in the modern critical edition may obscure variants preserved in the tradition derived from Peter Martyr d'Anghiera.

José Juan Arrom himself expanded many of his interpretations of Taíno religion in subsequent works, particularly in Mitología y artes prehispánicas de las Antillas, where he developed a broader reconstruction of Antillean symbolic traditions based on linguistic, archaeological, and ethnohistorical evidence.

== See also ==
- Taíno mythology
- Cemí
- Behique
- Spanish chronicles of the Indies
