= Historia general de las Indias =

Book by Francisco López de Gómara

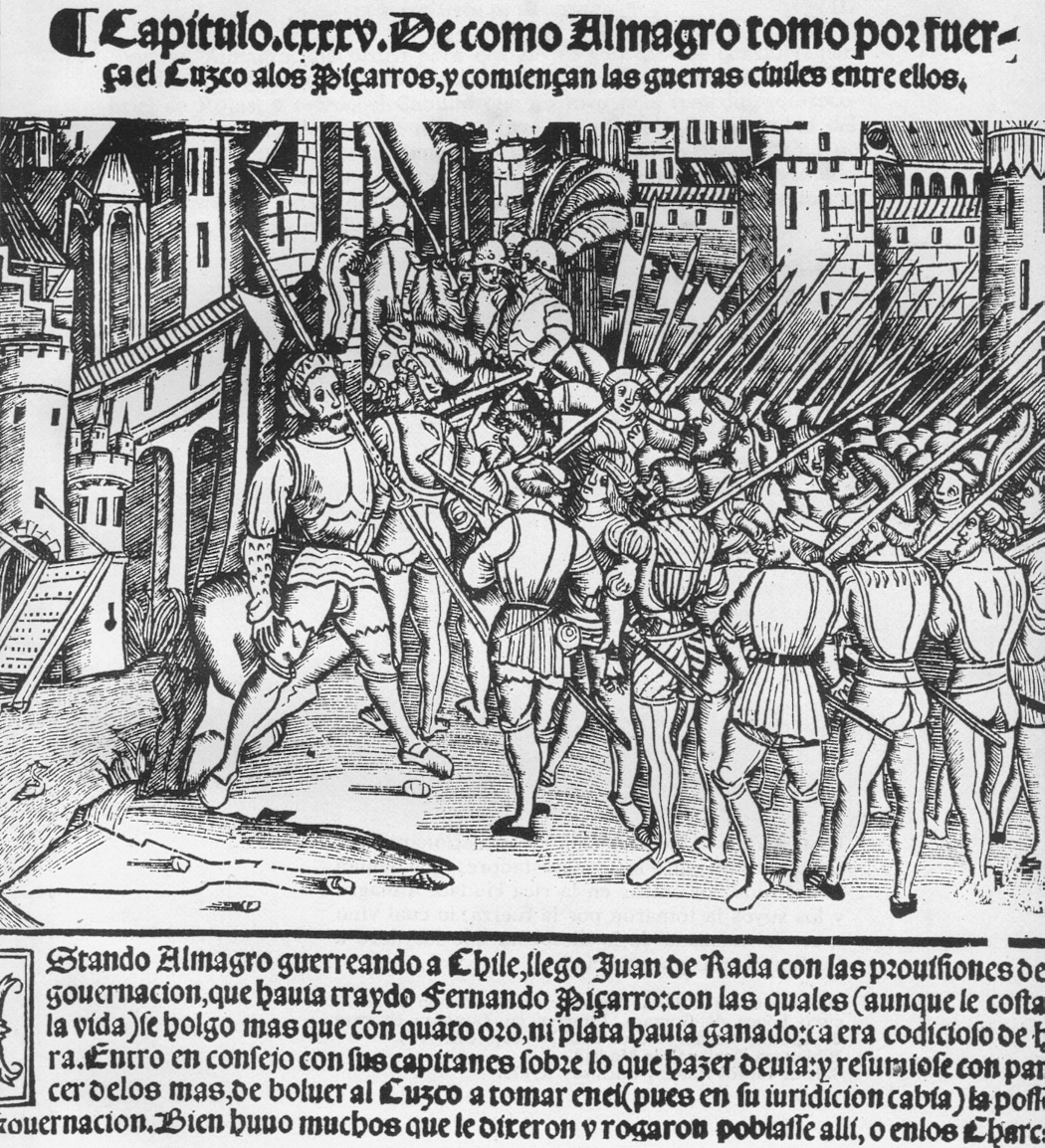
Page from "Historia General de las Indias" "Almagro in Cuzco".

Historia general de las Indias (General History of the Indies) is the account by Spanish historian Francisco López de Gómara of the Spanish conquest of the Aztec Empire. The first printing was in December 1552, in the workshop of Agustín Millán in Zaragoza, published under the title La istoria de las Indias (The History of the Indies)

The work was revised and published with different titles in subsequent years. The Spanish Crown forbade publication in 1556, but it was published in other languages up to 1605. For almost one hundred and fifty years it fell out of publication. Modern editions usually focus on the portion of the text relating to the conquest of the Aztec Empire.

== Subsequent editions ==
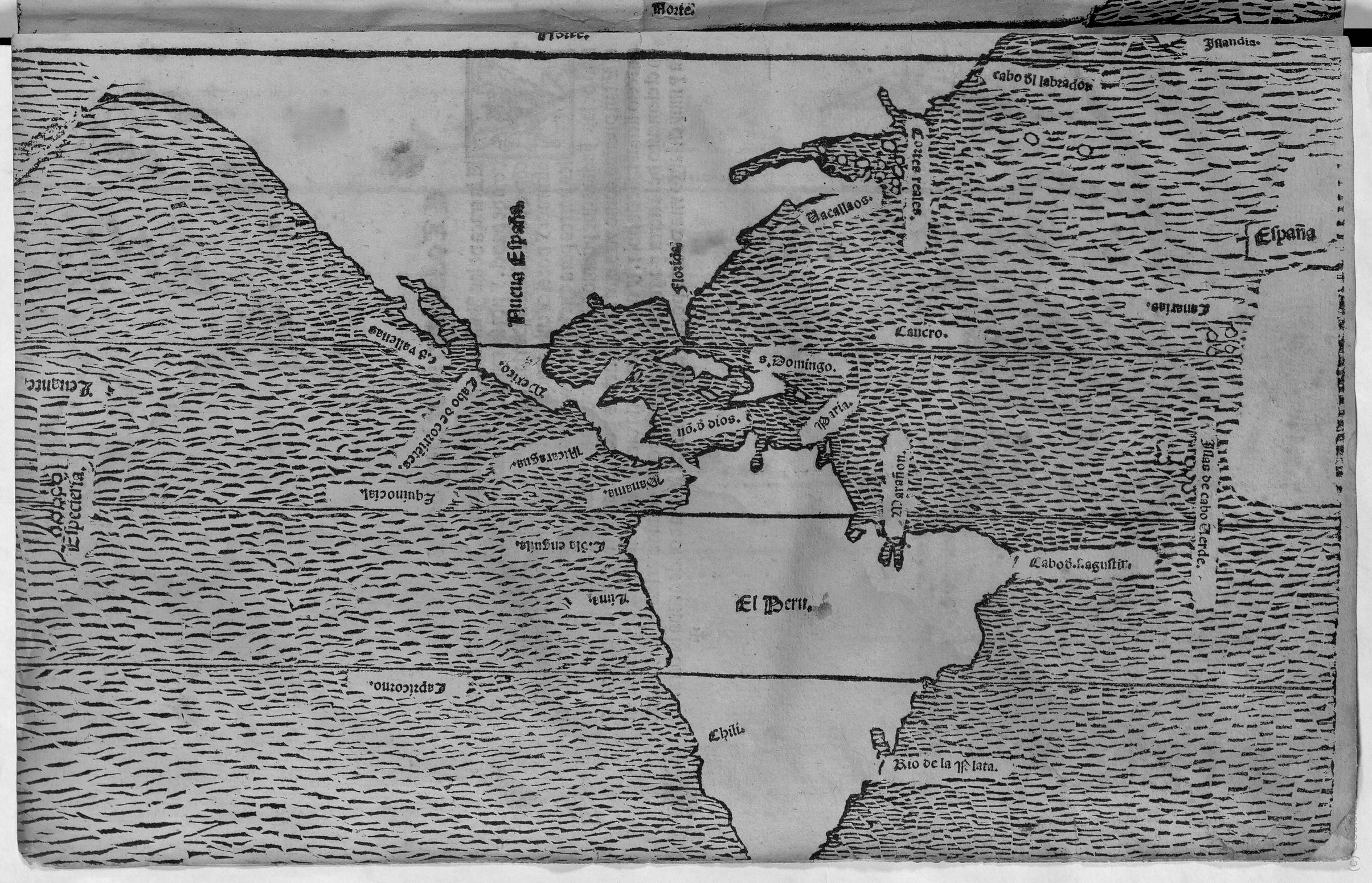
Map of "the Indies" (America) in a 1553 edition of the Historia general de las Indias.

In 1553 the work was republished by the same publisher, and under the same name as the original. Another edition of the work published in the same year was titled Hispania Victrix, primera y segunda parte de la Historia General de las Indias con todo el descubrimiento y cosas notables que han acaecido dende que se ganaron hasta el año de 1551. Con la conquista de México de la Nueva España (Hispania Victrix, First and Second Parts of the General History of the Indies, with the Discovery and Notable Events that have Occurred Since it was Won until the Year 1551. With the Conquest of Mexico of New Spain), published in Medina del Campo, in the house of Guillermo de Millis. In this printing, the work has an introductory letter dedicated to the emperador de romanos y rey de España Carlos I de España, señor de las Indias y del Nuevo Mundo (Emperor of the Romans and King of Spain Carlos V, Lord of the Indies and of the New World):

"Muy soberano señor: La mayor cosa después de la creación del mundo, sacando la encarnación y muerte del que lo crio, es el descubrimiento de Indias; y así, las llaman Mundo Nuevo. Y no tanto le dicen nuevo por ser nuevamente hallado, cuanto por ser grandísimo, y casi tan grande como el viejo, que contiene a Europa, África y Asia. También se puede llamar nuevo por ser todas sus cosas diferentísimas de las del nuestro. Los animales en general, aunque son pocos en especie, son de otra manera; los peces del agua, las aves del aires, los árboles, frutas, yerbas, y grano de la tierra que no es pequeña...." (Very sovereign lord: The greatest thing after the creation of the world, excluding the Incarnation and death of the one who created it, is the discovery of the Indies; and like this, they are called the New World. And not only do they say new for being newly discovered, so much as because they are gigantic, and almost as large as the Old World, which holds Europe, Africa and Asia. It can also be called new because of all the very different things from the ones in our world. The animals in general, although few in species, are of another mode; the fish of the water, the birds of the air, the trees, fruits, grasses, and grains of the earth which aren't small.....)

— Francisco López de Gómara

In 1554 the author added dates, for which reason the release was titled "La historia General de las Indias y Nuevo Mundo, con más de la conquista del Perú y de México" (The General History of the Indies and the New World, with More on the Conquest of Peru and Mexico), published in Zaragoza in the house of Pedro Bernuz.

In the second part, the author added a dedication to "muy ilustre señor don Martín Cortés, marqués del Valle" (Very illustrious Don Martín Cortés, marquess of the Valley) :

"A ninguno debo intitular, muy ilustre Señor, la Conquista de México, sino a vuestra señoría, que es hijo del que lo conquistó, para que, así como heredó el mayorazgo, herede también la historia. En lo que uno consiste la riqueza, y en otro la fama; de manera que andarán junto honra y provecho..."

("To no one should I entitle, illustrious sir, the conquest of Mexico, but to your lordship, who is son of who conquered it, so that, as you inherited the majorat, you inherit as well the history. In that one makes up the wealth, the other makes up the fame; in the way that honor and providence walk together...")|Francisco López de Gómara

The book was a success and was translated into Italian, French, and English. It was published in Rome, Venice, Paris and London, with new editions outside of Spain published between 1556 until 1605.

In Spain, the publication of the book was banned by royal decree in 1556, which also ordered confiscation of copies already published.

== The sources ==
Gómara never traveled to America, but he took note of news that reached Spain, aided by the limited maps of the conquered territories. His sources were manuscripts and writings of friar Toribio de Benavente "Motolinia", Gonzalo Fernández de Oviedo y Valdés, Pedro de Alvarado, Andrés de Tapia, and the interviews he had with Hernán Cortés.

== Opinions of historians contemporary to Gómara ==
The Peruvian writer known as Inca Garcilaso de la Vega used the book as a source for his book, Comentarios Reales de los Incas. A copy of Historia general de las Indias annotated by Garcilaso de la Vega remains extant. Francisco Cervantes de Salazar copied much of Gomara's book to make his Crónica de la Nueva España.

On the other side, Bernal Díaz del Castillo, who had been a soldier in the expeditions and conquests, heavily criticized the book in his Historia verdadera de la conquista de la Nueva España, in particular because Gómara had never set foot in the Americas, and for the book's praising of Hernán Cortés, without giving credit to others involved. Nevertheless, he referenced the timeline of the work while composing his own account.

Friar Bartolomé de las Casas detested the book for its glorification of Hernán Cortés. The Spanish Crown also disagreed with the excessive glorification of Cortés.

== Banning ==
The publication of the book was banned by royal decree, a ban reaffirmed during the reign of Philip II of Spain and which was in effect for many years. There was never a formal explanation for the ban, but it could have been because of the excessive praise of Cortés, for the criticisms directed at the Catholic Monarchs, if not for the manner in which it referred to Francisco de los Cobos, secretary of Carlos V. The writer had the consolation that it was published in other languages.

"El Príncipe. Corregidores, asistente, gobernadores, alcaldes e otros jueces e justicias cualesquier de todas las ciudades, villa e lugares destos reinos e señoríos, e a cada uno y cualquier de vos a quien esta mi cédula fuere mostrada o su treslado signado de escribano público. Sabed que Francisco López de Gómara, clérigo, ha hecho un libro intitulado Historia de las Indias y Conquista de México, el cual se ha impreso; y porque no conviene que el dicho libro se venda, ni lea, ni se impriman más libros dél, sino los que están impresos se recojan y se traigan al Consejo Real de las Indias de Su Majestad....."

— Decree in the village of Valladolid, 17 November 1553

(Translation)"The Prince. Correidors, assistant, governors, mayors and other magistrates and justices of any kind in all the cities, villages and lands of these realms and seigneuries, and to everyone and anyone to whom this my decree is shown, or its copy signed by public notary. Know that Francisco López de Gómara, clergyman, has written a book titled Historia de las Indias y Conquista de México, which has been printed; and because it is not advisable that said book be sold, nor read, nor have more copies printed, that rather those that are printed be collected, and brought to the Consejo Real de las Indias de su Majestad....."

== Later publications ==
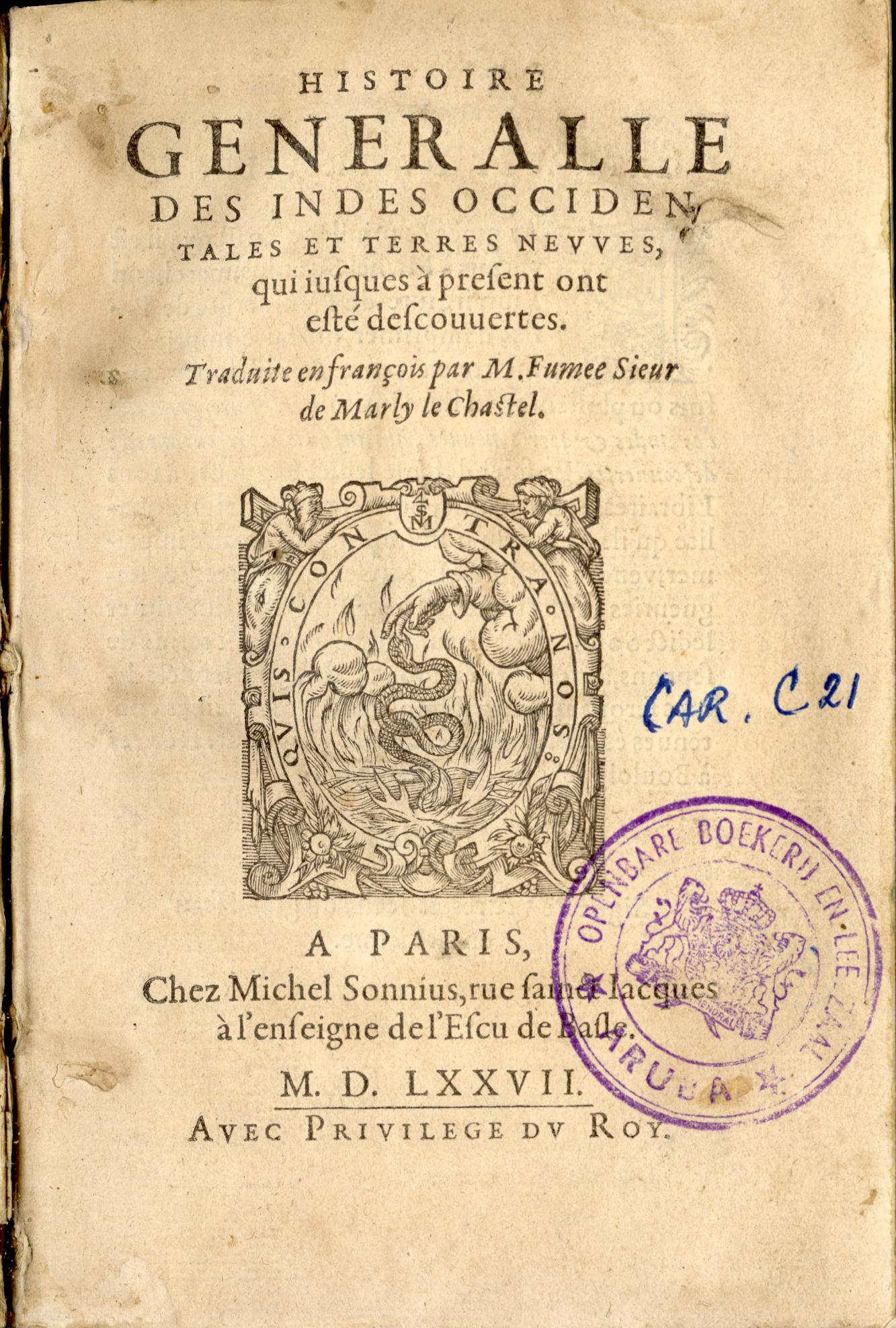
Title page of the 1577 edition of Martin Fumée's French Language translation of Historia general de las Indias.

In 1568, the work was published in French, translated by Martin Fumée, as Histoire generalle des Indes, which was republished numerous times in the sixteenth and early seventeenth centuries. This translation greatly influenced sixteenth-century French thinkers, among whom Michel de Montaigne, who drew on Fumée's edition numerous times in writing his essay "Des coches" (1588, essay III, 6 of the Essais).

In 1749, Gómara's work was republished, included in the second of a three volume collection by Andrés González de Barcia, entitled Historiadores primitivos de las Indias Occidentales, Vol II (Primitive Historians of the Occidental Indies, Volume II) published in Madrid. This was the third edition in Spanish.

In 1826, it was published under the title Historia de las conquistas de Hernando Cortés (History of the Conquests of Hernando Cortés) by the publisher Ontiveros in Mexico.

In 1852 and 1854, part of the book was published in Historia de la Conquista del Perú (History of the Conquest of Peru)

In 1943, it was published with the title Historia de las Indias y Conquista de México (History of the Indies, and the Conquest of Mexico) by the publisher Pedro Robredo, in two volumes.

In 1954, it was reedited and titled Historia general de las Indias "Hispania victrix", cuya segunda parte corresponde a la Conquista de Méjico (General History of the Indies "Hispania Victrix", Whose Second Part Corresponds with the Conquest of Mexico) by the publisher Iberia.

In 1988, it was published as Historia de la conquista de México (History of the Conquest of Mexico), by the publisher Porrúa, in the collection Sepan Cuantos.

== See also ==
- Francisco López de Gómara
- Spanish conquest of the Aztec Empire
- Spanish conquest of the Inca Empire
- Spanish conquest of Yucatán
