= Kronik =

Kronik may refer to:

- KroniK, an American professional wrestling tag team
- Kronik (album), 1998 album by Voivod

== See also ==
- Kronic (disambiguation)
- Kronick, surname
