= Kronic =

Kronic may refer to:

- Kronic (DJ), Australian DJ
- Kronic, brand of synthetic cannabinoid in Australia

== See also ==
- Kronick, surname
- Kronik (disambiguation)
- Chronic (disambiguation)
