= Francisco López de Gómara =

Spanish historian (1511 – c. 1564)

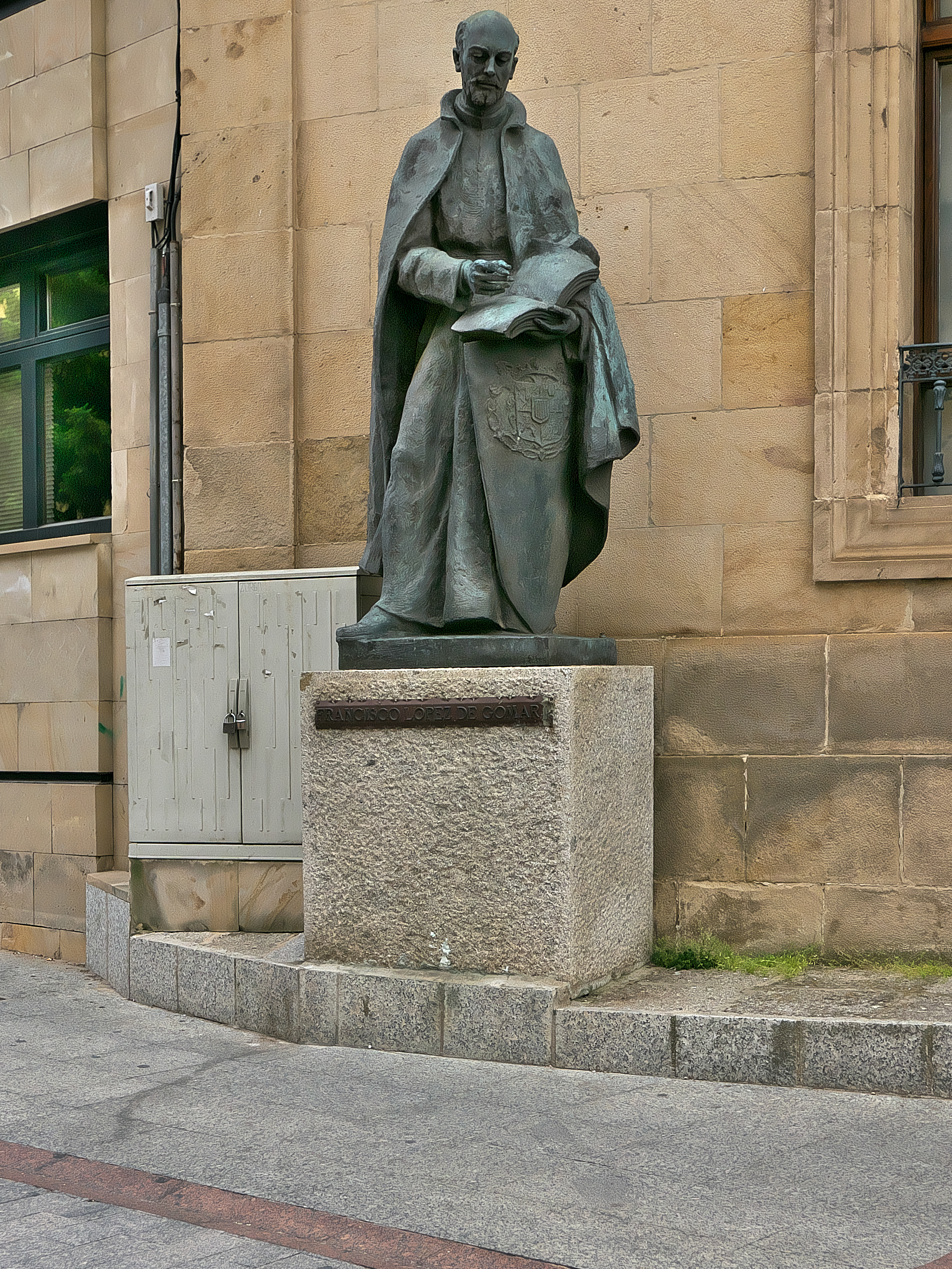
Sculpture of Francisco López de Gómara by Federico Coullaut-Valera in Soria, Spain

Francisco López de Gómara (February 2, 1511 – c. 1564) was a Spanish historian who worked in Seville, particularly noted for his works in which he described the early 16th century expedition undertaken by Hernán Cortés in the Spanish conquest of the New World. Although Gómara himself did not accompany Cortés, and had in fact never been to the Americas, he had firsthand access to Cortés and others of the returning conquistadores as the sources of his account. However other contemporaries, among them most notably Bernal Díaz del Castillo, criticised his work as being full of inaccuracies, and one which unjustifiably sanitised the events and aggrandised Cortés' role. As such, the reliability of his works may be called into question; yet they remain a valuable and oft-cited record of these events.

== Biography ==
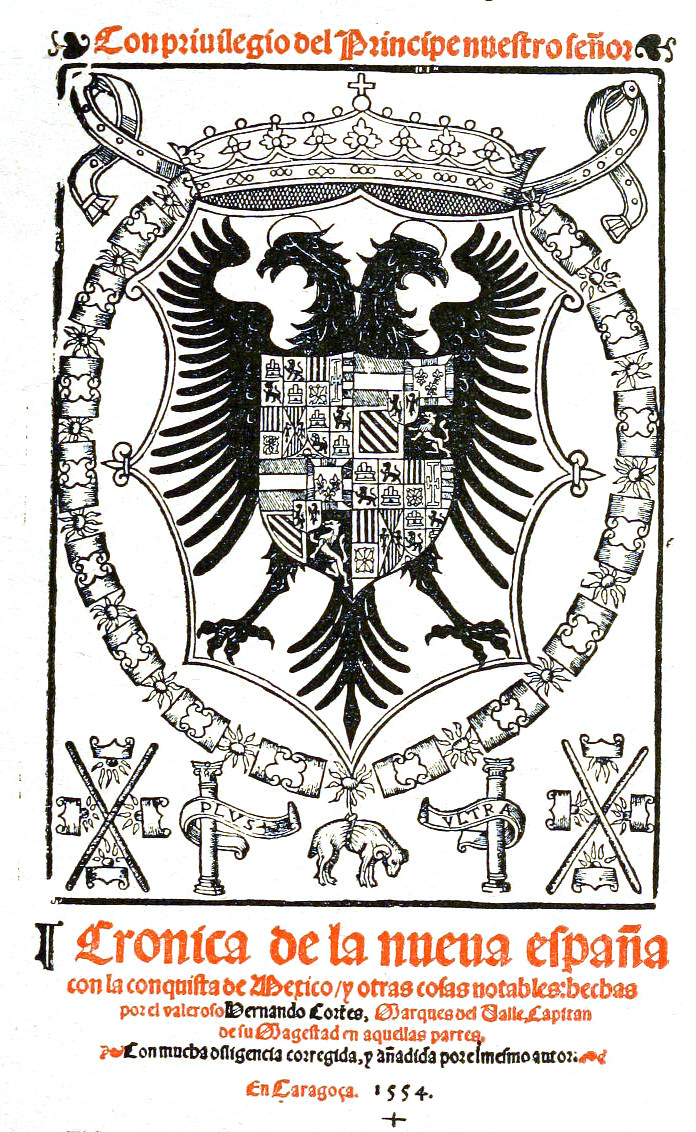
Cover of 1555 book

He was born at Gómara on February 2, 1511. He studied at the Alcalá de Henares where he was later ordained a priest. In the 1530s he spent most of his time in Italy serving Spanish ambassador Diego Hurtado de Mendoza. He returned from Italy after 1540 and entered the service of Hernán Cortés as secretary and chaplain.

He accompanied Cortes on the Algiers expedition (1541) and, after the death of his patron, it is known that he was at Valladolid in 1556 or 1557, after which he is supposed to have retired to his native city of Seville where he probably died.

With the information given him by the conqueror and other persons who had returned from the New World (he himself cites Gonzalo de Tapia and Gonzalo de Umbria) he wrote his Historia general de las Indias, a work published at Zaragoza in the year 1552. It was translated into French by Martin Fumée and published at Paris in 1578; Augustin Gravaliz translated it into Italian and published it at Venice in 1560; lastly, Juan Bautista de San Anton Chimalpain Quauhtlehuanitzin translated it into Nahuatl. The author relates in the first part, which is dedicated "To Don Carlos, Emperor of Romans, King of Spain, Lord of the Indies and New World", the whole discovery and conquest of the Antilles, Peru (up to the pacification effected by Pedro de la Gasca), Chile and Central America, also the voyage of Magellan and the discovery of the Moluccas. In the second part he tells of the conquest of Mexico, and it is dedicated "To the very llustrious Lord Don Martin Cortés, Marques del Valle"—the son and heir of the conqueror.

Due to his desire to aggrandize his patron Cortés, and his relying on the firsthand information which the latter gave him (Gómara was never in America), among other possible reasons, the accuracy of Gómara's history was often questioned. Prince Philip (afterwards Philip II of Spain), in a decree issued at Valladolid on November 17, 1553, ordered all the copies of his work that could be found to be gathered in and imposed a penalty of 200,000 maravedis on anyone who should reprint it. The banning could have been because of the excessive praise of Cortés, for the criticisms directed at the Catholic Monarchs, or for the manner in which it referred to Francisco de los Cobos, secretary of Carlos V. The ban was maintained through the rule of Phillip as Phillip II. The prohibition was removed in 1727 through the efforts of Andreas Gonzalez Martial who included Gómara's work in his collection of early historians of the New World (Coleccion de historiadores primitivos de las Indias Occidentales). The Verdadera historia de la Conquesta de Nueva Espana ("True History of the Conquest of New Spain") of Bernal Díaz del Castillo, a companion of Hernán Cortés, was written to refute Gómara. But Gómara's account remained very popular, possibly due to its concise, rapid and pleasant literary style, which attracted many readers and translators. Among other works of his which have remained unpublished are Batallas de mar de nuestros tiempos ("Contemporary Naval Battles") and Historia de Harrue y Harradin Barbarroja.

== Works ==
- Historia general de las Indias y todo lo acaescido en ellas dende que se ganaron hasta agora y La conquista de Mexico, y de la Nueva España (1553)
- La segunda parte de la Historia general de las Indias que contiene La conquista de Mexico, y de la Nueva España (Vida de Hernán Cortés) (1553)
- Crónica de los Barbarrojas
- Anales de Carlos V
- Guerras de Mar del Emperador Carlos V
- De rebus gestis Ferdinandi Cortesii

=== English Translations ===
1. Annals of the Emperor Charles V by Roger Bigelow Merriman for the Oxford Clarendon Press (1912)
2. The General History of the Indies by Clayton Miles Lehmann and Angela Helmer, published by the University Press of Colorado (2024)
3. Cortés: The Life of the Conqueror by His Secretary, published by the University of California Press (1964)
  1. Chimalpahin's Conquest by Susan Schroeder and Arthur J. O. Anderson, published by Stanford University Press (1997) - an adapted version of Gómara's text that was rewritten by 17th-century Nahua historian Chimalpahin to include indigenous viewpoints.

== See also ==
- List of Spanish chroniclers of the Indies
