= Christopher Columbus's journal =

Diary and logbook of Christopher Columbus

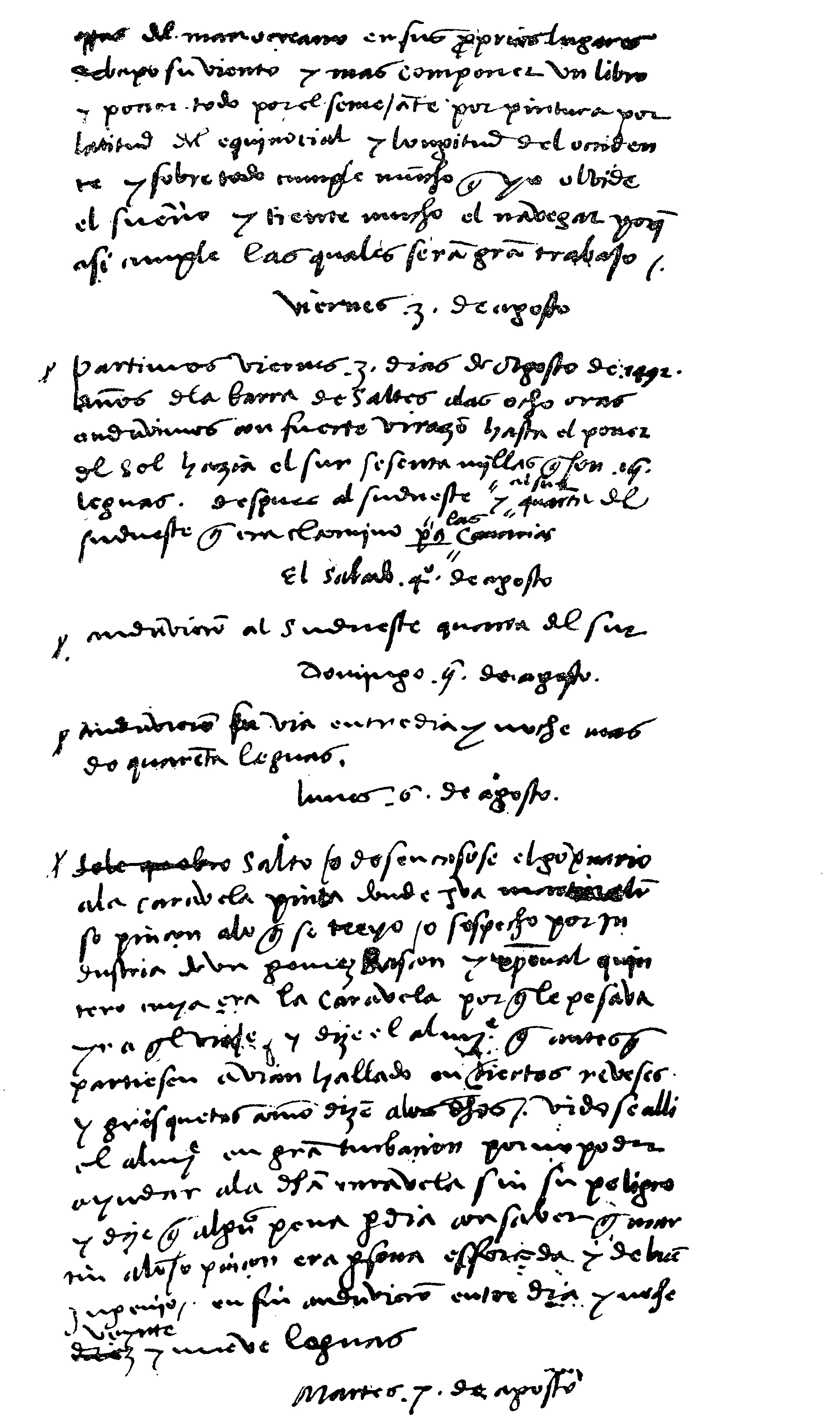
- by Bartolomé de las Casas, scribe
- Writing: Spanish
- Created: 3 August 1492 — 15 March 1493
- Present location: Unknown, presumed lost

Christopher Columbus's journal (Diario) is a diary and logbook written by Christopher Columbus about his first voyage. The journal covers events from 3 August 1492, when Columbus departed from Palos de la Frontera, to 15 March 1493 and includes a prologue addressing the sovereigns. Several contemporary references confirm Columbus kept a journal of his voyage as a daily record of events and as evidence for the Catholic Monarchs. Upon his return to Spain in the spring of 1493, Columbus presented the journal to Isabella I of Castile. She had it copied, retained the original, and gave the copy to Columbus before his second voyage. The whereabouts of the original have been unknown since 1504. The copy descended to Columbus's grandson, Luis, who is thought to have sold it in order to fund his dissipated lifestyle. It too is now lost.

The only surviving version of the journal is an abstract written by Bartolomé de las Casas in preparation for his work Historia de las Indias. Since the discovery of the las Casas copy in the late 18th century, scholars have questioned the accuracy of the copy and its fidelity to the original.

== Background ==
The story of Christopher Columbus's origins and young life preceding his sea-faring voyages is still largely unknown. Columbus survived the sinking of a Portuguese ship, worked for a merchant, and began mapping with his brother Bartholomew before his marriage to Dona Filipa Moniz Perestrelo in 1478. Columbus was interested in studying geography, philosophy, theology, and history. Columbus lived the life of a wandering traveler through his ocean-oriented profession until 1480. Through inaccurate calculations and estimates, Columbus believed that he could successfully travel west to east in order to open up a new trade route to the East Indies. Initially, Columbus presented his potential trade passage to John II of Portugal, who rejected his request for financial accommodations to support his eastward expedition. Afterwards, Columbus experienced a number of dismissals from presenting his proposal to Venice, Genoa, France, and King Henry VII of England, before reaching Queen Isabella I and King Ferdinand II of Spain in January 1492. Columbus's first presentation of his expedition to the Spanish royalty resulted in denial. Yet after a reexamination pushed by Columbus's persistent attitude and unique character, Isabella and Ferdinand agreed to finance his first voyage. Columbus and 90 men commenced their journey from Palos on 3 August 1492 in three ships, the Santa María, the Niña, and the Pinta.

== Contents ==
In the prologue, Columbus mentions his orders to sail to India were received in January 1492, following the expulsion of Jews from Spain. Conflicting reports exist over the actual date of the expulsion, with Columbus citing January while other sources, including the Alhambra Decree, cite March. After the prologue, the diary begins with Columbus's departure from Spain towards the Canary Islands "half an hour before sunrise" on 3 August 1492. On 16 September Columbus reported he had entered the Sargasso Sea. The journal mentions several animals encountered during the westward voyage, such as dolphins and frigatebirds. Columbus also describes magnetic declination. Because European sailors had only previously traveled with eastern magnetic declination, Columbus is credited with discovering western magnetic declination for Europeans. The journal also briefly mentions the crew's mood during the voyage. Columbus writes that the covered distance regularly announced to the crew was usually smaller than the real one. On the eve of arrival to the New World, the journal reported an unknown light sighting. Columbus named the first landfall of his voyage San Salvador on 12 October, and described the people residing on the island as naive and naked, but welcoming to the European explorers. Even though the journal shows Columbus's imperfect knowledge of the Spanish language, he makes comparisons of the New World landscape to that of Spain, such as spring-like in Andalusia, rivers like those in Seville, and hills like those behind Córdoba. Dr. Margarita Lila Rosa argues that even though Columbus’s journal is written from the perspective of a European colonizer, it is still possible to read it for information about indigenous women and their resistance against the Spanish.

== Publication history ==
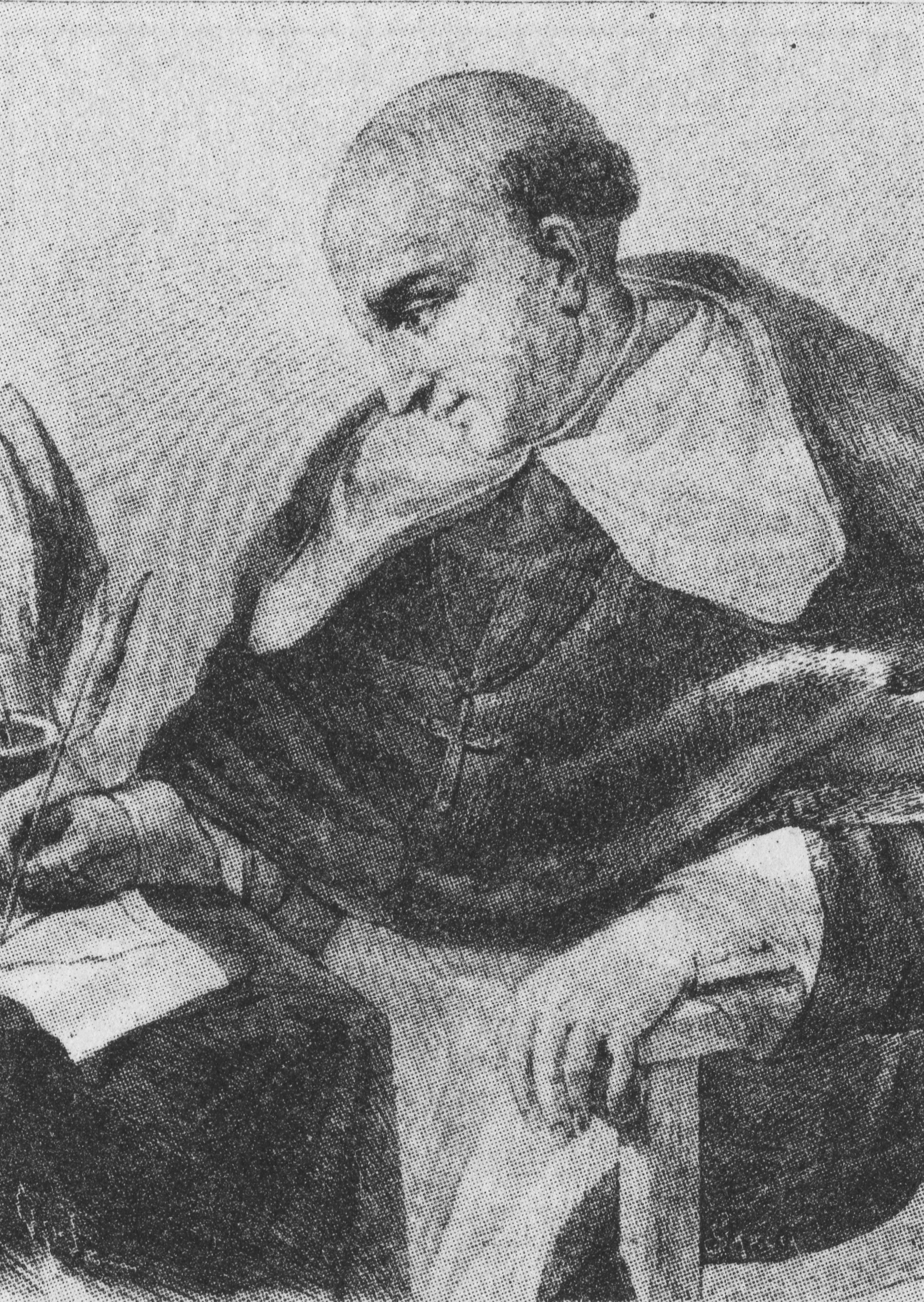
The only surviving copy of Columbus's journal was written by Bartolomé de las Casas

All existing copies of the journal are based on Bartolomé de las Casas' abstract – a manuscript of 76 folios discovered in the library of the Duke of the Infantado by Martín Fernández de Navarrete in 1790. The manuscript was kept in the Biblioteca Nacional de España until 1925 when it was reported missing. Navarrete reported the discovery of the journal's abstract to his friend, Juan Batista Muñoz, who used it in his Historia del Nuevo Mundo published in 1793. In 1825, Navarrete published the abstract with expanded abbreviations, spelled out numerals, corrected punctuation and modernized spelling.

Bartolomé de las Casas did not have the original journal either and was relying on a copy when he made his abstract. The author of this copy made several errors, frequently confusing the Columbian league with the Roman mile. The authenticity of las Casas's abstract was challenged by Henri Vignaud and Rómulo D. Carbia, both of whom believed it to be largely or entirely a fabrication. In 1939, las Casas's abstract was proven to be authentic by Samuel Eliot Morison, and this view was endorsed in later studies.

Columbus's journal has been translated into English, Italian, French, German, Russian and other languages. The first English translation was made by Samuel Kettell and published in 1827. In 1991, an English translation based on the Sanz facsimile of the las Casas copy was published by the University of Oklahoma Press. John Cummins wrote The Voyage of Christopher Columbus: Columbus' Own Journal of Discovery in 1992, mixing translated parts of las Casas's copy of the journal with excerpts from Diego Columbus's biography, to provide a comprehensive first-hand account of Columbus's first voyage.

== Reception and analysis ==
Multiple scholarly interpretations and descriptions of Columbus and his actions are based on the de las Casas transcription rather than the original copy of Columbus's Diario which has disappeared. John E. Kizca, a professor and history department chair at Washington State University, argues that since the only remaining primary source of Columbus's journal was transcribed by Bartolome de las Casas, las Casas's transcription cannot be relied upon. Kizca asserts that de las Casas's translation is biased due to his own personal opinions of Columbus and the magnitude of his actions in the Americas. Kizca explains that de las Casas hides Columbus's true motives through his transcription because he observes Columbus as the representative figure of manipulating the Native Americans and "as the embodiment of Spanish policy towards overseas expansion.". In The Conquest of Paradise: Christopher Columbus and the Columbian Legacy, Kirkpatrick Sale displays Columbus through passages of his journal as the chaotic result of a corrupted European society. Sale concludes that Columbus was overwhelmed by the pressures of Spain to discover something significant, which led to his materialistic-minded and polarizing perspective of the Native Americans and their home. Charles Alperin of the Jewish Federation of Omaha and many other Jewish scholars have pointed to the prologue of Columbus's journal as evidence for his Jewish heritage. Conspiracists cite the prologue's unexpected delay in Columbus's departure and the vague mentions of Jewish people as the primary evidence in Columbus's first-hand journal.

Jose Rabasa, professor of Romance languages and Literatures at Harvard University, describes Columbus's journal as an accurate account of his journey, despite Columbus not actually reaching the East Indies. Rabasa characterizes Columbus's narrative of his discovery as picturesque and glorified, citing examples from las Casas's transcription like "pretty water," "stones with gold-covered spots," and "a good river." Rabasa indicates that Columbus composes his journal with a conqueror approach to exploration in order to convince Queen Isabella of the industrial potential of the new lands. Elvira Vilches, author and professor of Romance studies at Duke University, approaches Columbus's intentions for his journal in a purely religious light. Vilches considers the Diario as Columbus's proof that he successfully spread Christianity to the Americas and as Columbus's evidence that he should acquire more resources to conduct more voyages to the New World. Vilches contends that Columbus's successful presentation of the contents of his journal and accompanied slaves from his first voyage commenced a chain of events. Vilches traces Columbus's mass murder and elimination of Native Americans back to his promise to the Spanish royalty of finding enough gold to fund a Christian crusade in Jerusalem. Vilches argues that the journal's documented New World potential directly led to the promise of gold which resulted in the massacre of innocent Taíno. Dona de Sanctis, the editor in chief of the Italian American magazine, defends Columbus's interactions with the Tainos through his Diario. She specifies that Columbus compliments the Native Americans' appearance and acumen upon first meeting them; she explains that Columbus's crew only retaliated with violence after the men Columbus left behind were killed off by the Tainos, and that Columbus's journal should serve as an important historical artifact emphasizing the significance of Columbus's accomplishments. However, according to the journals, Columbus, unable to prove the Taino actually perpetrated the massacre, took no action whatsoever against the Taino.

The University of Oklahoma's translation, The Diario of Christopher Columbus' First Voyage to America 1492–1493, won the "Spain and America in the Quincentennial of the Discovery" award gifted by the Spanish government in 1991 in celebration of the 500th anniversary of Columbus's discovery of the Americas. Robert Fuson, professor of geography at the University of South Florida, was awarded both the "Book of the Year" by the Library Journal and the "Elliott Montroll Special Award" by the New York Academy of Sciences for his work The Log of Christopher Columbus.
