= Historia de las Indias =

Historical account of the Spanish conquest of the Caribbean

Historia de Las Indias
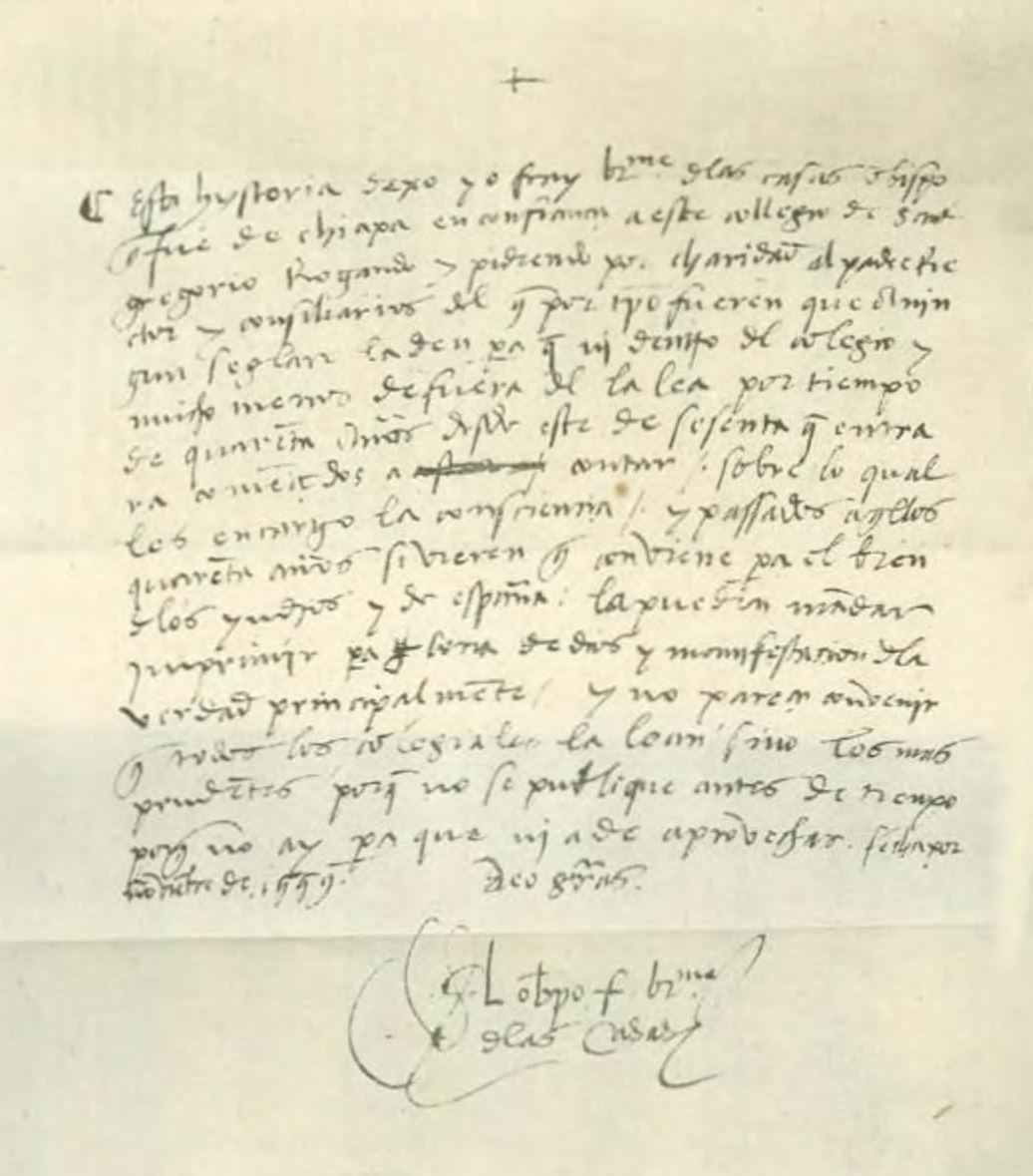
- Manuscript published in Volume III of the History of the Indies.
- Author: Bartolomé de las Casas
- Language: Spanish
- Publication date: 1875
- Publication place: Spanish Empire

Historia de Las Indias an account written by the Spanish Dominican friar Bartolomé de las Casas about the Spanish conquest of the Caribbean. The work served both as an autobiographical account as well as a critical history of the Spanish mistreatment of the Indigenous peoples of the Caribbean.

== History ==
Written between 1527 and 1561, Bartolomé de las Casas intended his Historia as a call for political and social change in relation to the Spanish treatment of the Indigenous peoples of the Americas. Las Casas wrote the manuscript while living in retirement at the Monastery of San Francisco, Santo Domingo in what is now the Dominican Republic.

Although the manuscript was written in the 16th century, it was first published in Madrid, Spain in 1875.

== See also ==
- A Short Account of the Destruction of the Indies
- Indigenous peoples of the Caribbean
