= A Short Account of the Destruction of the Indies =

Account of atrocities committed against Native Americans

A Brief Account of the Destruction of the Indies
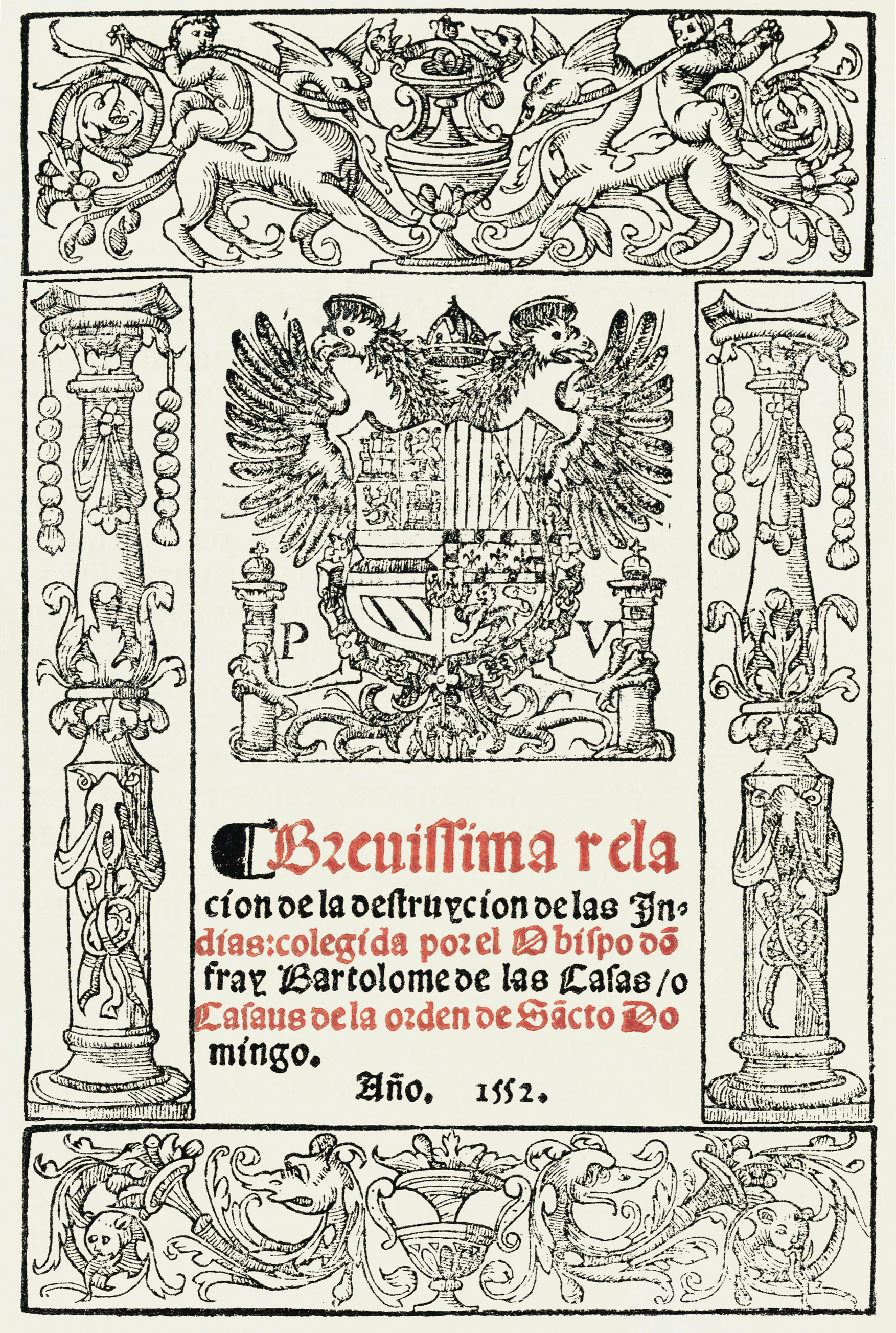
- Cover of the Brevísima relación de la destrucción de las Indias
- Author: Bartolomé de las Casas
- Original title: La Brevísima relación
- Language: Spanish
- Publication date: 1552
- Publication place: Spanish Empire

A Short Account of the Destruction of the Indies (Spanish: Brevísima relación de la destrucción de las Indias) is an account written by the Spanish Dominican friar Bartolomé de las Casas in 1542 (published in 1552) about the mistreatment of and atrocities committed against the Indigenous peoples of the Americas in colonial times and sent to then prince Philip II of Spain.

== Background ==
Bartolomé de las Casas explains in the prologue that his fifty years of experience in Spanish colonies in the Indies granted him both moral legitimacy and accountability for writing this account. In 1516, Las Casas was granted the title of Protector of the Indians by Cardinal Cisneros after he submitted a report on their population decline due to harsh labor and mistreatment by colonial officials. During the time when Las Casas served as the Protector of the Indians, several clerics from the Order of Saint Jerome attempted to reform systems which used the native populace as laborers. However, Las Casas found their attempts insufficient to protect the welfare of the Indians, and returned to Spain to appeal to the Spanish monarch in 1517.

From 1517 to 1540, Las Casas traveled back and forth between Spain and Spanish colonies in Latin America numerous times, struggling to find a common ground between Spanish authorities and his own attempts to improve the conditions of Indian subjects in Spanish dominions. One of the purposes of his travels was to continue to protest Spanish colonial mistreatment of Indians.

In 1542, after Las Casas first wrote the chronicle later known as A Short Account of the Destruction of the Indies, during the hearings ordered by Charles V of Spain to resolve issues of forceful conversion and colonial exploitation of Indians, Las Casas presented the account before the members of the Council of the Indies as proof of atrocities committed upon Indians by colonial authorities.

== Contents ==
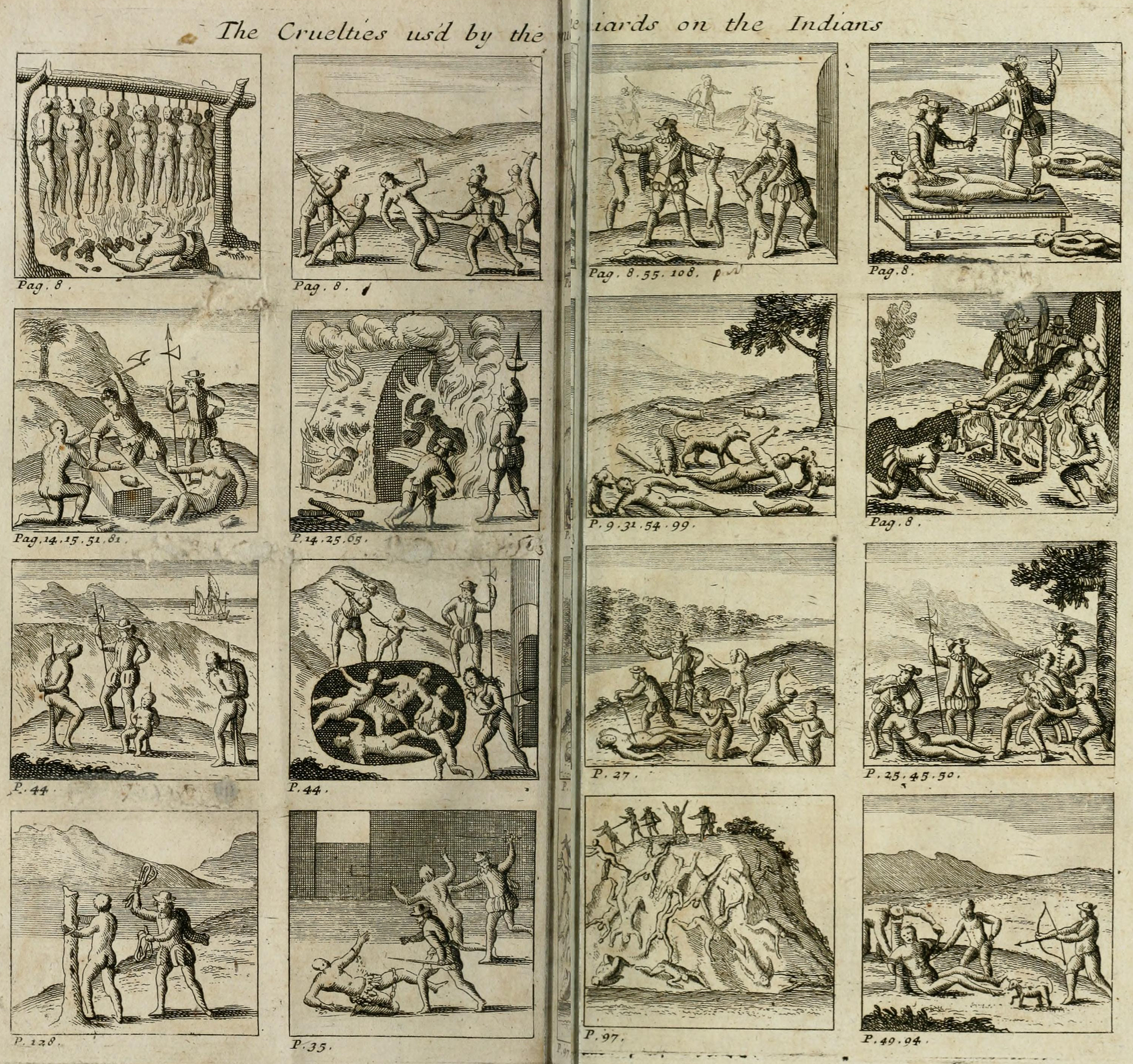
The cruelties used by the Spaniards on the Indians

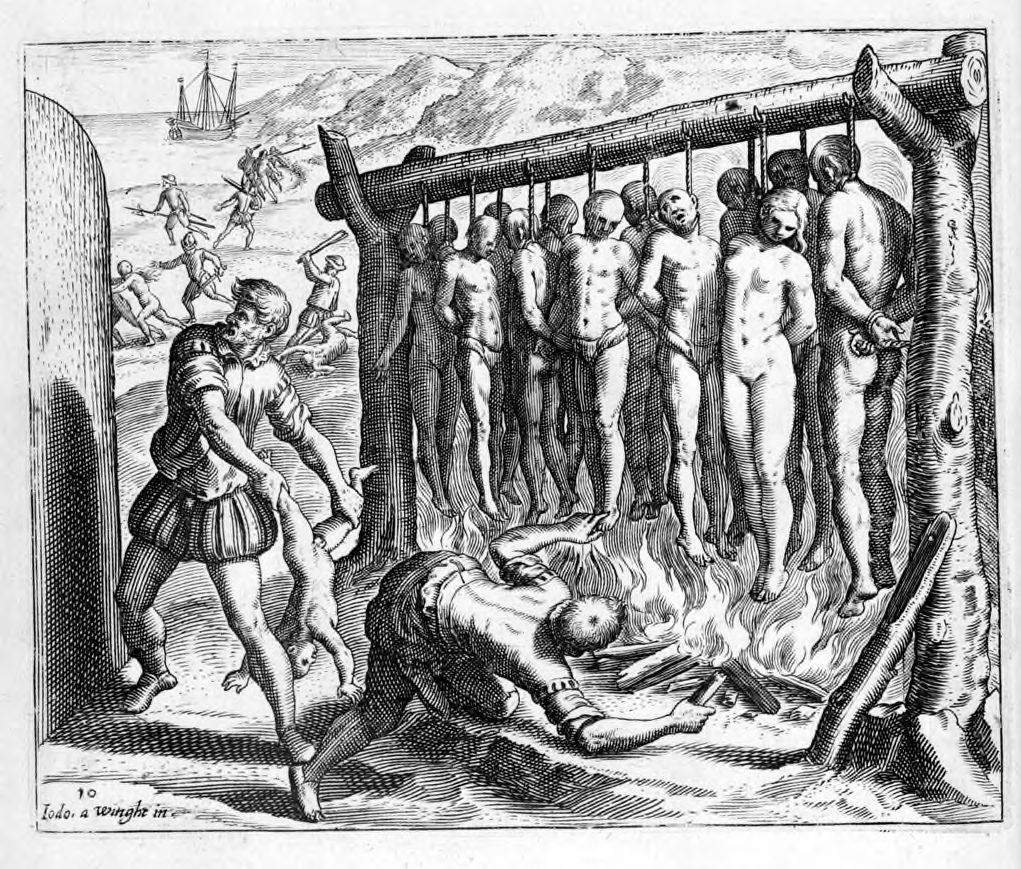
A 16th-century illustration by Flemish Protestant Theodor de Bry, depicting Spanish atrocities during the conquest of Hispaniola, (bearing in mind that an anti-Catholic and anti-Spanish rhetoric is present throughout these portraits). Las Casas wrote: "They erected certain Gibbets, large, but low made, so that their feet almost reached the ground, every one of which was so ordered as to bear Thirteen Persons in Honour and Reverence (as they said blasphemously) of our Redeemer and his Twelve Apostles, under which they made a Fire to burn them to Ashes whilst hanging on them"

It was written for Prince Philip II of Spain. Las Casas appeals to the Prince's pathos throughout his account. One of the stated purposes for writing the account is his fear of Spain coming under divine punishment, and his concern for the souls of the Native peoples. The account is one of the first attempts by a Spanish writer of the colonial era to depict examples of unfair treatment that Indigenous people endured in the early stages of the Spanish conquest of the Greater Antilles, particularly the island of Hispaniola. De las Casas noticed that no matter where he visited, the Spanish were committing the same crimes. On the island of Hispaniola, the Spanish were herding people into a straw building and setting fire to it, burning the occupants alive. In addition, "they sent the Males to the Mines to dig and bring away the Gold, which is an intolerable labor; but the Women they made use of to Manure and Till the ground, which is a toil most irksome even to Men of the strongest and most robust constitutions, allowing them no other food but Herbage, and such kind of unsubstantial nutriment, so that the Nursing Women's Milk was exsiccated and so dryed up, that the young Infants lately brought forth, all perished." On Puerto Rico and Jamaica, he saw the Spanish, "with the same purpose and design they proposed to themselves in the Isle of Hispaniola, perpetrating innumerable Robberies and Villanies as before," and that "These two Isles containing six hundred thousand at least, though at this day there are scarce two hundred men to be found in either of them." De las Casas also notes that what the Spanish were doing drove many natives to commit suicide. On Cuba, "By the ferocity of one Spanish Tyrant (whom I knew) above Two Hundred Indians hang'd themselves of their own accord; and a multitude of People perished by this kind of Death" and "Six Thousand Children and upward were murder'd, because they had lost their Parents who labour'd in the Mines."

== Legacy ==
A Short Account of the Destruction of the Indies marks a significant moment in the way 21st century colonial Latin American historians would address world history. By comparing what historians know today about colonial Latin America, with the descriptions and recommendations given by De Las Casas in A Short Account, they are able to understand more about Europeans' biases, prejudices, and outlook on the colonization of the Americas. De Las Casas' A Short Account was a revised history of the conquest, in the way that he includes facts that would aid him in his argument. Political scientist Diego von Vacano argued De Las Casas' A Short Account, revealed the ways 16th century scholars used rhetoric to lobby for changes during the Spanish colonization of the Americas. In his earlier writings De Las Casas advocated the defense of Indigenous peoples by recommending the use of African slaves as an alternative to Indigenous people, but later repudiated the suggestion and condemned both the enslavement of Indigenous people and Africans.

De Las Casas used the term "New World" to look at the Americas and Western hemisphere and did not use the term or idea of the "ancient world" as a way to describe Spain, Europe and the Eastern hemisphere. This linguistic shift marked a transition in historical text and thought by moving away from the medieval view of geography and world history to a more modern view. De Las Casas addressed the new population in the Americas and introduced it in a political way in addressing the Spanish King. De Las Casas introduced and presented the people of the Americas in the context of the Spanish empire.

De Las Casas is also noted as one of the first writers and thinkers to racialize the Indigenous people of the Americas. It has been argued that in his attempt to defend the Indigenous people by describing their bodies, skin color, language, and culture; De Las Casas racialized the Indigenous people and created a new understanding for them in the context and hierarchy of European ideas of race.

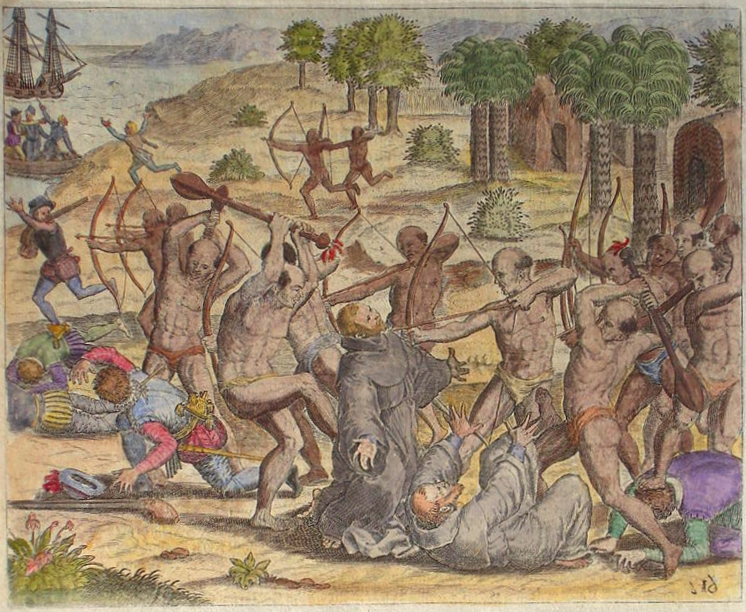
The Natives of Cumaná attack the mission after Gonzalo de Ocampo's slaving raid. Colored copperplate by Theodor de Bry, published in the "Relación brevissima de la destruccion de las Indias".

His account was responsible for the passage of the new Spanish colonial laws known as the New Laws of 1542, which abolished native slavery for the first time in European colonial history and led to the Valladolid debate. This text was used as a way to convince the King of Spain of the cruelties caused by the Spanish Conquistadors. As such, he did not focus on or mention the effects of disease as a cause of suffering for the native people. Instead, De Las Casas focused on the suffering caused by the Spanish conquistadors so that the King would address the conquistadors' behavior.

The account was republished in 1620, by Jan Evertszoon Cloppenburch, alongside the book Origin and progress of the disturbances in the Netherlands by Dutch historian Johannes Gysius. The book was frequently reprinted, alone or in combination with other works, in the Netherlands and in other countries struggling against the power of Spain in Europe and the Americas. The title in English, German, Dutch, and most languages, was manipulated to farther insist on the detrimental consequences of the Spanish conquest. The images described by Las Casas were later depicted by Theodor de Bry in copper plate engravings that contributed to the Spanish Black Legend.

== Rhetorical strategy ==
A Short Account of the Destruction of the Indies has been acclaimed by scholars for its rhetorical effect. De Las Casas juxtaposes the inhumane mistreatment of the Spanish conquistadors with the inherent goodness of the Indigenous people in an exaggerated manner in his strategy of persuasion. De Las Casas revised and re-edited this book in order to make his best argument in favor of the Indigenous people.

== See also ==
- Sublimis Deus
- List of Spanish chronicles of the Indies
