= Chronic =

Chronic may refer to:

- Chronic condition, a condition or disease that is persistent or otherwise long-lasting in its effects
- Chronic toxicity, a substance with toxic effects after continuous or repeated exposure
- Chronic (film), a 2015 American film
- The Chronic, a 1992 album by Dr. Dre
- The Chronic 2001, a.k.a. The Chronic 2, The Chronic II, and 2001, a 1999 album by Dr. Dre
- Chronic (cannabis), a slang name for high quality marijuana

== See also ==
- Cronic, surname
- Kronic (disambiguation)
- Chronos, a personification of time in Greek mythology
- Habit (psychology), routines of behavior that are repeated regularly
