= Cronaca Vera =

- Issue 117 (1974) (Note: The title reads: "She risked freezing to death for having excited a shy man from the valley - Beauful skier caught in the bear trap of the forester in love")
- Editor-in-chief: Giuseppe Biselli
- Categories: News magazine
- Frequency: Weekly
- Publisher: New Message Uno S.r.l.
- First issue: 1969
- Country: Italy
- Based in: Piazza Erculea 5 Milano 20122
- Language: Italian
- Website: Cronaca Vera
- ISSN: 1125-5544

Cronaca Vera (Italian for True Chronicles) is a weekly, tabloid news magazine, published in Italy.

== History ==
The magazine was founded in 1969 by entrepreneur Sergio Garassini, who had launched the monthly erotic magazine Kent. Garassini appointed Antonio Perria, crime author and former ABC editor who had also worked at L'Unità as a crime reporter, to be the periodical's first editor-in-chief. The graphic illustrator and comics artist Maurizio Bovarini was entrusted with the design of Cronaca, while he also, in the same year, started working as editor at the Italian edition of Hara-Kiri magazine.

== Content ==
The magazine is printed in "low-quality paper" and is sold retail for one euro. An issue typically contains from about a dozen up to fifteen reports ranging from local news to crime, from stories of everyday violence to controversies. It contains columns such as Il Racconto Giallo/Nero (Tales of Yellow/Black) (Note: The word giallo in Italian signifies not just the color yellow but also mystery fiction and thrillers. See Giallo.) with crime stories, or I Misteri del Sesso (The Mysteries of Sex), where readers write in about their sexual problems. Its titles, in "jarring yellows and reds," are considered by Vice magazine to be "wonderful."

Cronaca Vera is considered "a lurid tabloid" by some critics, although its covers are for others "unmissable", while for the mayoralty of Ribera, Agrigento, the magazine is "prestigious."

== Popularity ==
In the mid-1970s, Cronaca was selling approximately 600 thousand issues every week. Editor-in-chief Giuseppe Biselli contends that the magazine receives "approximately 20,000 letters" from readers every year. He agrees with the finding that it is the most popular publication among prison inmates.

== See also ==
- ABC
- L'Espresso
- Oggi
- Panorama
