= David A. Kronick =

American librarian and bibliographer

- Born: October 5, 1917; Connellsville, Pennsylvania, United States
- Died: February 12, 2006 (aged 88)
- Education: Western Reserve University (BA,BS, Library Science)
- Occupations: librarian, bibliographer
- Known for: researched the history of scholarly communication
- Notable work: see Selected bibliography
- Awards: see Awards

David A. Kronick (October 5, 1917 – February 12, 2006) was a librarian who researched the history of scholarly communication. He was once called a "bibliographic archaeologist".

He was a Fellow of the Medical Library Association and the American Association for the Advancement of Science, and achieved the rank of Distinguished Member in the Academy of Health Information Professionals.

== Education ==
Kronick was born in Connellsville, Pennsylvania and grew up in Cleveland. He earned his BA in 1939 and in 1940 his BS in Library Science, both from Western Reserve University. In 1956, he completed his PhD at University of Chicago's Library School His dissertation was on the history of the scientific journal from the 17th to the 18th century; he pursued this topic throughout his career.

== Career ==
He was in the US Army, from 1941 to 1946 and in World War II he served as a hospital supply officer, eventually as captain. He then joined Western Reserve University Medical School as a librarian from 1946–1949, before moving to the University of Chicago. During his PhD studies he was an assistant at the National Library of Medicine reference department (1953–1955). In 1955 he joined University of Michigan Medical Library, where he worked until 1959. He then moved to the Cleveland Medical Library, which he directed from 1959 to 1964. He then returned to the National Library of Medicine where he was chief of the Reference Division from 1964 to 1965. From 1965 to 1984, he served as (the first) library director of the Medical School of the University of Texas at San Antonio.

== Legacy ==
A fellowship bearing his name was established under the aegis of the Medical Library Association in 2002, to support travel to three or more North American medical libraries for the study of health information management. This memorializes Kronick's love of travel.

== Selected bibliography ==
- Scientific and Technical Periodicals of the Seventeenth and Eighteenth Centuries. Metuchen, NJ: Scarecrow Press; 1991.
- The Literature of the Life Sciences: Reading, Writing, Research. Philadelphia, PA: ISI Press; 1985.
- A history of scientific and technical periodicals. New York, NY: Scarecrow Press; 1962. 2nd ed. 1976.

== Awards ==
- Visiting Historical Scholar, National Library of Medicine, 1988–1989
- Medical Library Association Ida and George Eliot Award, 1987 for his book The Literature of the Life Sciences: Reading, Writing, Research.
- Medical Library Association Fellow, 1985
- Medical Library Association Janet Doe Lectureship, 1980
- Council on Library Resources, Fellowship, 1972
- Fellow of the American Association for the Advancement of Science, 1965
