= Andrés de Tapia =

Spanish conquistador (c.1498–1561)

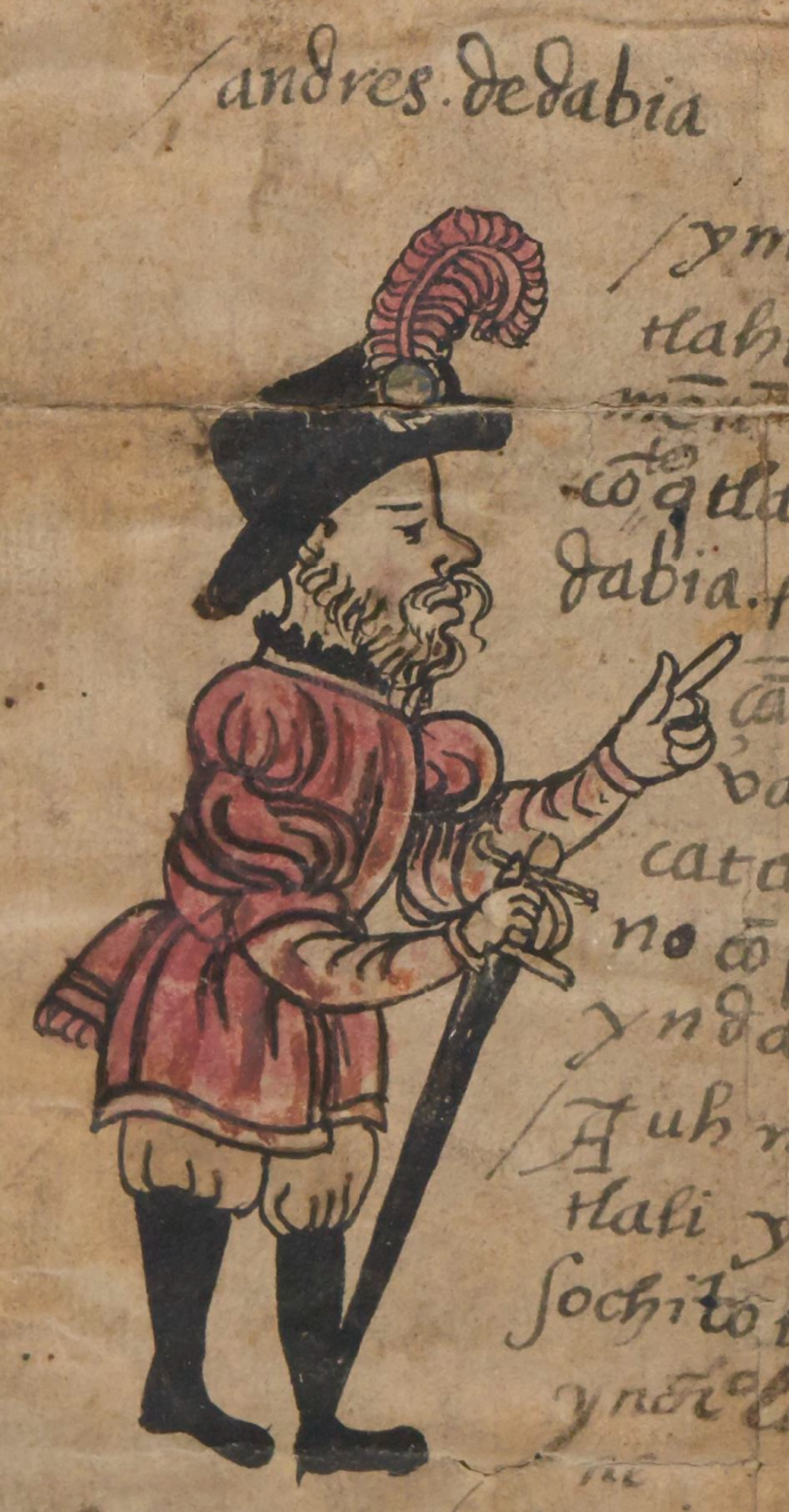
- Andrés de Tapia as depicted in the Manuscrito de Aperreamiento, 1560
- Born: c. 1490s Spain
- Died: 1561; Mexico
- Occupations: Conquistador and chronicler

Andrés de Tapia (c. 1490s? - October 1561) was a Spanish soldier and chronicler. He participated in the Spanish conquest of the Aztec Empire.

== Early life ==
Andrés de Tapia's origin is unclear, including his birthdate, birthname, place of origin, and his parents' names.

Historians indicate his birthplace was either in the Province of León or in Medellín, Spain. Regarding his birthdate, Bernal Díaz del Castillo said that Andrés de Tapia was 24 in 1518 (c. 1494), while Andrés de Tapia himself said was 64 in 1561 (c. 1497). Díaz del Castillo described him as "somewhat sallow and not very cheerful, and he has a good build, a light beard, and sparse facial hair".

== Conquest of the Aztec Empire ==
Andrés de Tapia was a stable hand for Diego Colón. By 1518, he arrived in Santiago de Cuba to join Hernán Cortés's army. Andrés de Tapia became Cortés's right-hand man, conquering the province of Chiametla at his request. In 1539, he published his chronic commonly known as Relación de Cortés, recounting firsthand accounts of the early stages of the conquest of the Aztec Empire, describing events until the arrest of Pánfilo de Narváez, as well as the life of Cortés.

== Later life and death ==
Andrés de Tapia married Isabel de Sosa and together had three sons and a daughter. They lived in Mexico City, New Spain. He died in 1561.
