= Urteaga =

Urteaga is a Basque surname which may refer to the following:

- Benito Urteaga (1946–1976), Argentinian Marxist revolutionary
- Irma Urteaga (1929–2022), Argentinian composer and pianist
- Juan de Urteaga (died 1540), bishop of Chiapas, Mexico
- Luis Alberto Urteaga (born 1960), Uruguayan modern pentathlete, competitor in the 1992 Summer Olympics
- Mario Urteaga Alvarado (1875–1957), Peruvian painter

== See also ==
- José Antonio Urtiaga (1942–2024), Spanish footballer
