= Félix Parra =

Mexican painter (1945–1919)

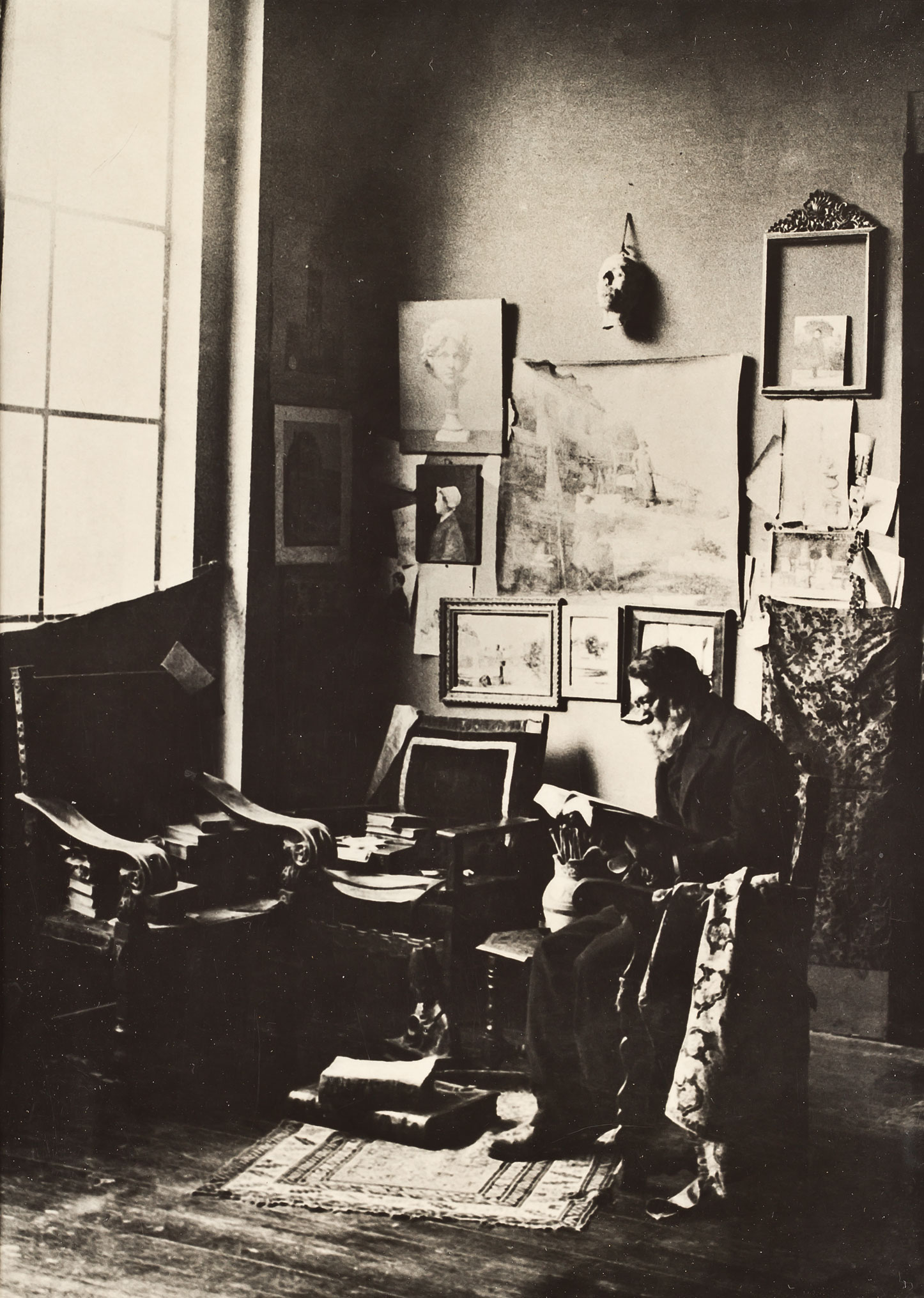
- Félix Parra in his studio (early 20th century).
- Born: Félix Parra Hernández; 17 November 1845; Morelia, Michoacán
- Died: 9 February 1919 (aged 73); Tacubaya (nowadays Mexico City)
- Education: Academy of San Carlos
- Known for: Painting
- Notable work: Galileo at the University of Padua Demonstrating the New Astronomical Theories (1873), Fray Bartolomé de las Casas (1875), Episodes of Conquest: Massacre of Cholula (1877).
- Patrons: Ramón de Lascuráin

Félix Parra Hernández (17 November 1845 – 9 February 1919) was an artist from Mexico who lived in the late 19th and early 20th centuries. During his life, Parra worked as an instructor of ornament drawing at the Academy of San Carlos, located in Mexico City. Through his compositions, Parra conveyed themes and narratives that demonstrated the changes in Mexican culture he experienced or observed during his time in the academy and critical world, providing a glimpse into history and shifting society from his perspective. Additionally, his works, particularly his images depicting natives, served as inspiration for later muralists such as Diego Rivera and José Clemente Orozco.

== Biography ==
Parra was born on 17 November 1845, near Morelia, Michoacán, Mexico. From the time of his birth until 1877, Parra bounced around Mexico, attending different artistic institutions beginning in 1861. At the institutions, Parra showed great talent, eventually earning a scholarship for his proven artistic ability in 1877. The following year, Parra traveled across the Atlantic Ocean to Europe to continue his pursuit of artistic studies. For the next four years, Parra studied in France and Italy before returning to Mexico in 1882, at which time he took a position as a professor of ornament drawing at the National School of Fine Arts. He worked solely at the school until 1909, when he took on a secondary position at the National Museum. Here, he focused on his other artistic passions and developed his skills in medias of sketching and watercolor. In 1915, he stepped away from his role as a professor at the school, which, by this time, was no longer an institution focused on the pursuit of artistic endeavors. Four years later, on 9 February 1919, Parra died in Tacubaya, a suburb of modern-day Mexico City. He was 73 years of age at the time of his passing.

== Education and Training ==
In 1861, at age 16, Parra entered the School of Drawing and Painting at the College of San Nicolás, located in Morelia, Mexico. A pupil in the field of academic painting, Parra attended the college for three years before moving on to the Academy of San Carlos, located in Mexico City, in 1864. Here, Parra was exposed to a synthetic collage of domestic and foreign stylings introduced by a new wave of professors, most of whom were Mexican artists with Spanish artistic education backgrounds. His exposure led to Parra picking up key elements of both the Mexican and European artistic styles, many of which can be seen integrated into his works.

While at the academy, Parra presented a number of his works in small internal art shows consisting of pieces created by the academy's students. In 1871, he put on display a nude done very much in the European style. Two years later, in 1873, one of his most notable pieces, Galileo Demonstrating the New Astronomical Theories at the University of Padua, an oil painting done on canvas, was put on display. This work was followed by another oil on canvas work, Fray Bartolomé de las Casas, unveiled in 1875. Finally, in 1877, Parra put on display Episodes of Conquest: The Massacre of Cholula, a work that would significantly impact the coming years of his life. His historic academic painting portraying Cortés and his conquest across Mexico, ravaging native culture in the process, earned Parra a scholarship from the university to travel across the Atlantic Ocean and to continue his artistic education in Europe.

Beginning in 1878, Parra would spend four years between France and Italy, learning from and working under other master painters. At the conclusion of his ventures in 1882, Parra decided to return home to his native Mexico and took a position as a professor of ornamentation at the National School of Fine Arts.

== Career ==
Upon his return to Mexico in 1882, Parra took a position at the National School of Fine Arts as a professor of ornamentation, an art practice based on sketching. Parra continued to use oils after taking the position, creating works such as Solos in 1898 and Still Life with Saucepans in 1917. However, because of his new teaching position, the rate at which he produced or publicly unveiled oil-based works was significantly reduced.

His role at the artistic institution was his primary focus and sole professional occupation from 1882 until 1909, at which time he began working at the National Museum on top of continuing his duties as a professor. During his time at the museum, Parra began experimenting with another new media: watercolors. Few examples of works produced using these mediums have been verified as his, and those that have are not precisely dated. That being said, pieces such as an untitled work depicting a landscape with trees portray his abilities around the turn of the century or shortly thereafter.

== End of Career and Death ==
Parra officially stepped away from his role at the school in 1915, marking an end to his tenure as a professor after 33 years. Despite removing himself from art education, he continued to engage with his artistic endeavors, producing the aforementioned Still Life with Saucepans in 1917, his final known artwork before his passing in 1919.

== Analysis of Notable Work(s) ==
=== Episodes of Conquest: The Massacre of Cholula (1877) ===
Parra's 1877 composition, Episodes of Conquest: The Massacre of Cholula, portrays the victorious Spanish conquistadors, including Hernán Cortes, standing over the defeated indigenous people of Cholula. While the light of the piece places emphasis on Cortes’ figure in the center of the painting, there are other key details that guide the narrative and convey the message of the work. To the left of Cortes lies a deceased native man while a native woman and her child cower to Cortes’ right. Behind Cortes stand other Spaniards who eagerly assess the spoils of their victory.

The state of the natives in this work carry multiple levels of significance. First of all, they all appear defeated and afraid, exemplifying the emotional destress of the event being depicted and driving the narrative of this particular painting. More subtly, there are implicit messages conveyed by the positioning of these figures as well. None of the natives appear higher in the work than the conquistadors. This plays with the Spanish belief that they were more “civilized” and thus superior to the natives of the region. Additionally, the bodily position of the deceased native man holds an important meaning. As he lays motionless, his body falls into a position that mimics that of a crucifixion. This detail ties the work together with the perceived intent of the conquest itself, the spread of Christianity into the New World.

The final significance of the state of natives depicted in the work by Parra is as an allusion to the future of native culture. As the male dies, it end his bloodline as he is no longer able to father new children. The same holds true for the native culture as a whole. As native people die at the hands of the Spanish invaders, the perceived future of the culture grows shorter as there are fewer individuals to continue native practices.

== Exhibitions ==
- 1873 - XVI (16th) Exposición de la Escuela Nacional de Bellas Arte, hosted by La Escuela Nacional de Bellas Arte.
- 1875 - XVII (17th) Exposición de la Escuela Nacional de Bellas Arte, hosted by La Escuela Nacional de Bellas Arte.
- 1876 - Centennial International Exposition of Philadelphia, May 10 to November 10, 1876.
- 1940 - Twenty Centuries of Mexican Art, hosted by the Museum of Modern Art, May 15 to September 30, 1940.
- 2013-2014 - Felix Parra, 1845-1919: A Visionary Amid Centuries, hosted by Museo Nacional de Arte, November 21, 2013 to July 6, 2014.

== Works ==
- Galileo Demonstrating the New Astronomical Theories at the University of Padua, 1873, Oil on canvas. Museo Nacional de Arte.
- Fray Bartolome de las Casas, 1875, Oil on canvas. Museo Nacional de Arte.
- Episodes of Conquest: The Massacre of Cholula, 1877, Oil on canvas. Museo Nacional de Arte.
- Solos, 1898, Oil on canvas. Museo Nacional de Arte.
- Still Life with Saucepans, 1917, Oil on canvas. Museo Nacional de Arte.
- Head of Saint John the Baptist, Undated, Oil on cardboard. Museo Nacional de Arte.
- Untitled (Architectural Landscape in Grays), Undated, Oil on canvas. Museo Nacional de Arte.
- Untitled (Landscape-Trees), Undated, Watercolor on paper. Museo Nacional de Arte.
- Untitled (Allegory-Angel Head), Undated, Oil on cardboard. Museo Nacional de Arte.
- Untitled (Seated Characters), Undated, Oil on cardboard. Museo Nacional de Arte.

== Gallery ==
Gallery

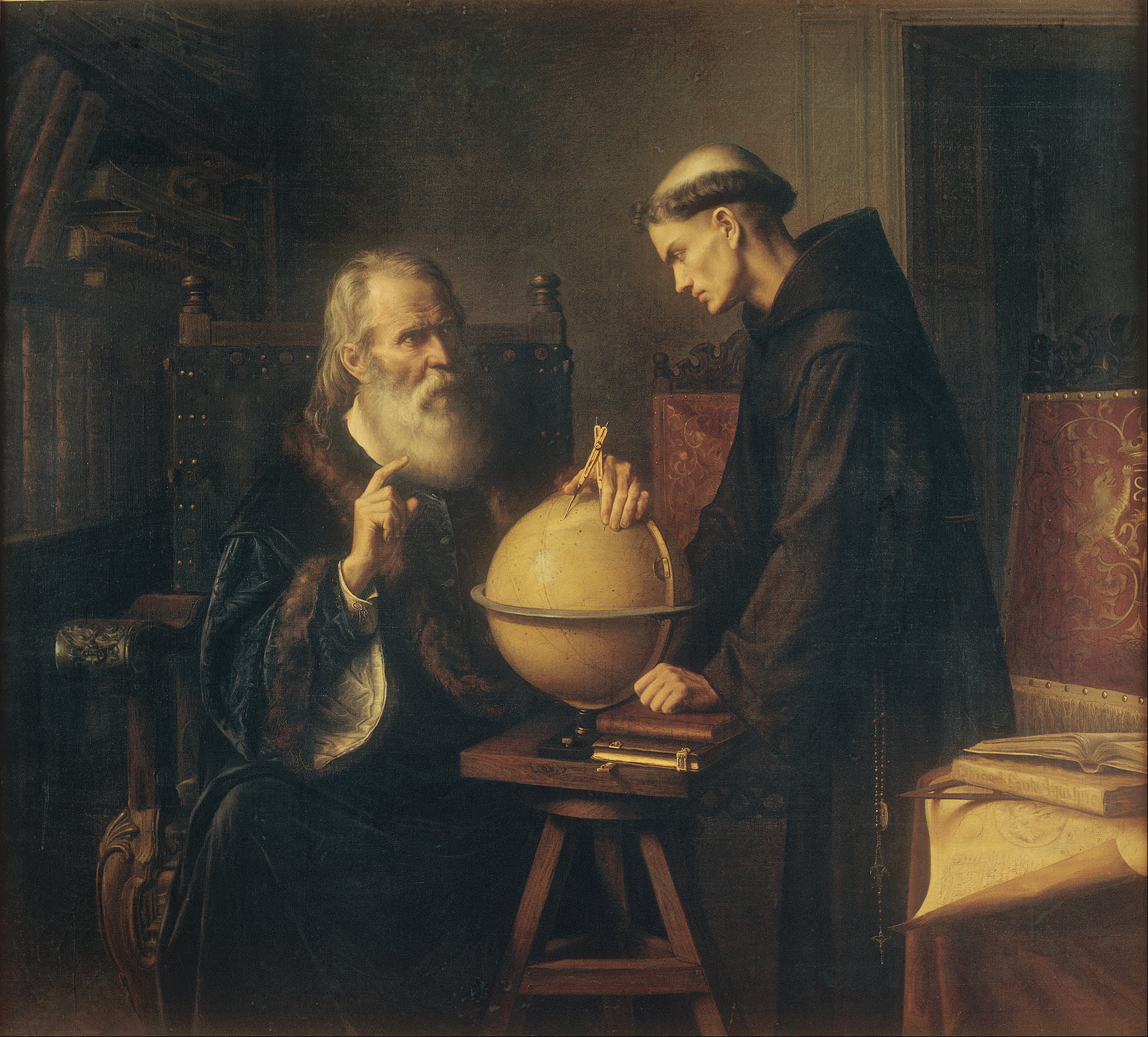
Galileo en la Universidad de Padua Demostrando las Nuevas Teorías Astronómicas ("Galileo at the University of Padua Demonstrating the New Astronomical Theories", Oil on Canvas, 1873). Held at the Museo Nacional de Arte.

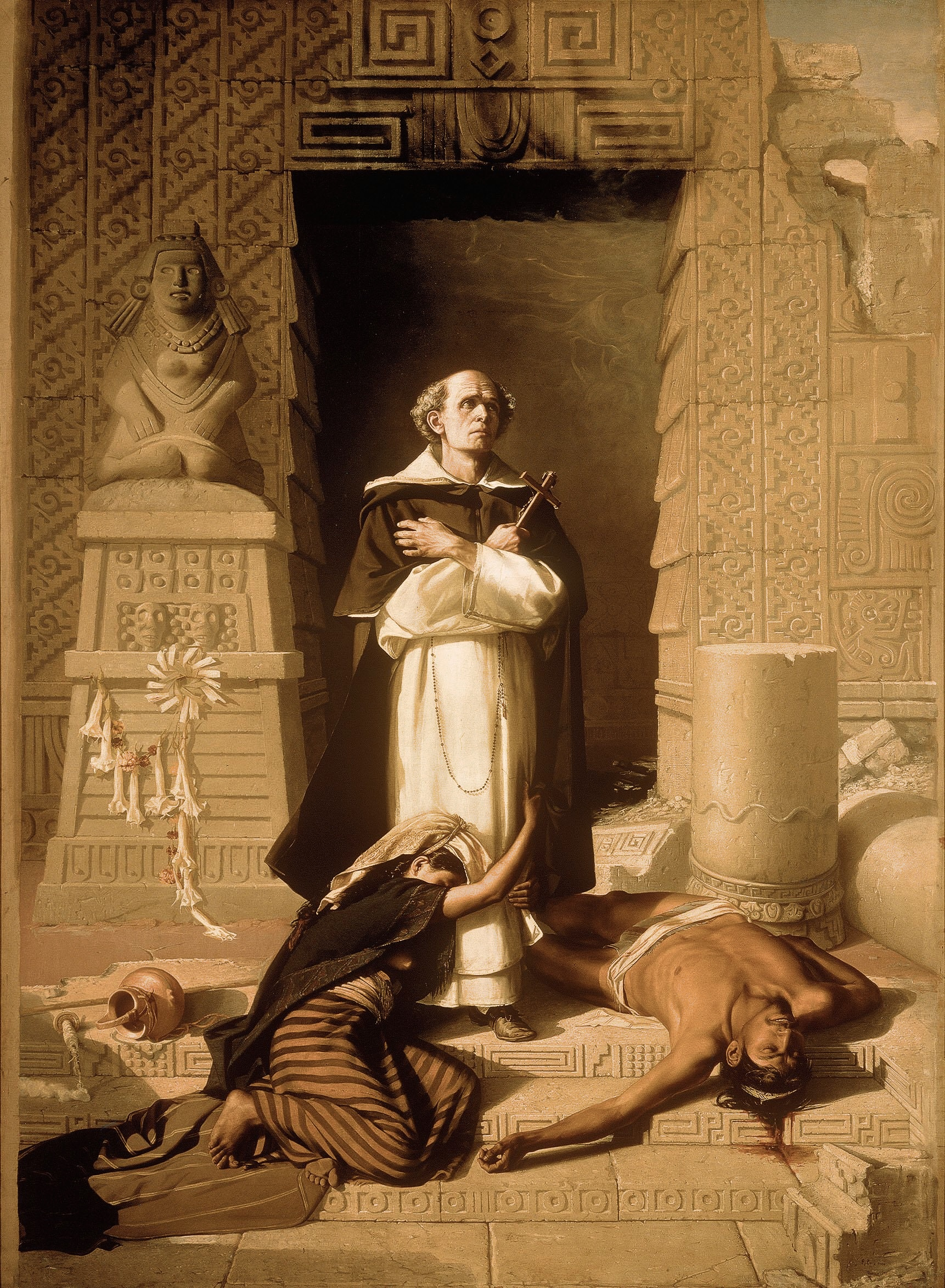
Fray Bartolomé de las Casas, Oil on Canvas (1875) exhibited at the Centennial International Exposition of Philadelphia in 1876. Held at the Museo Nacional de Arte.

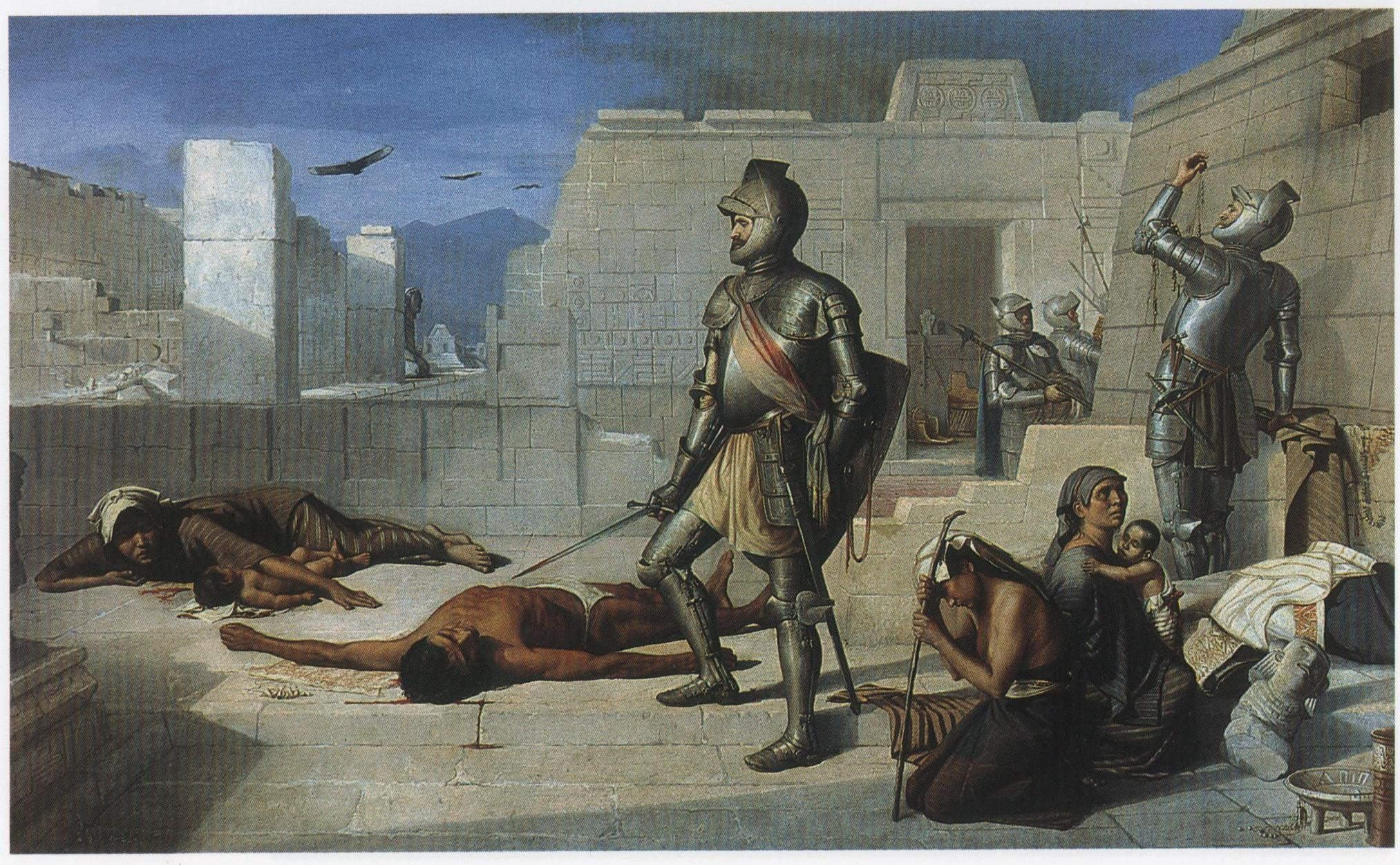
Episodios de la Conquista: La matanza de Cholula ("Episodes of the Conquest [of Mexico]: The Massacre of Cholula", Oil on Canvas, 1877). Held at the Museo Nacional de Arte.

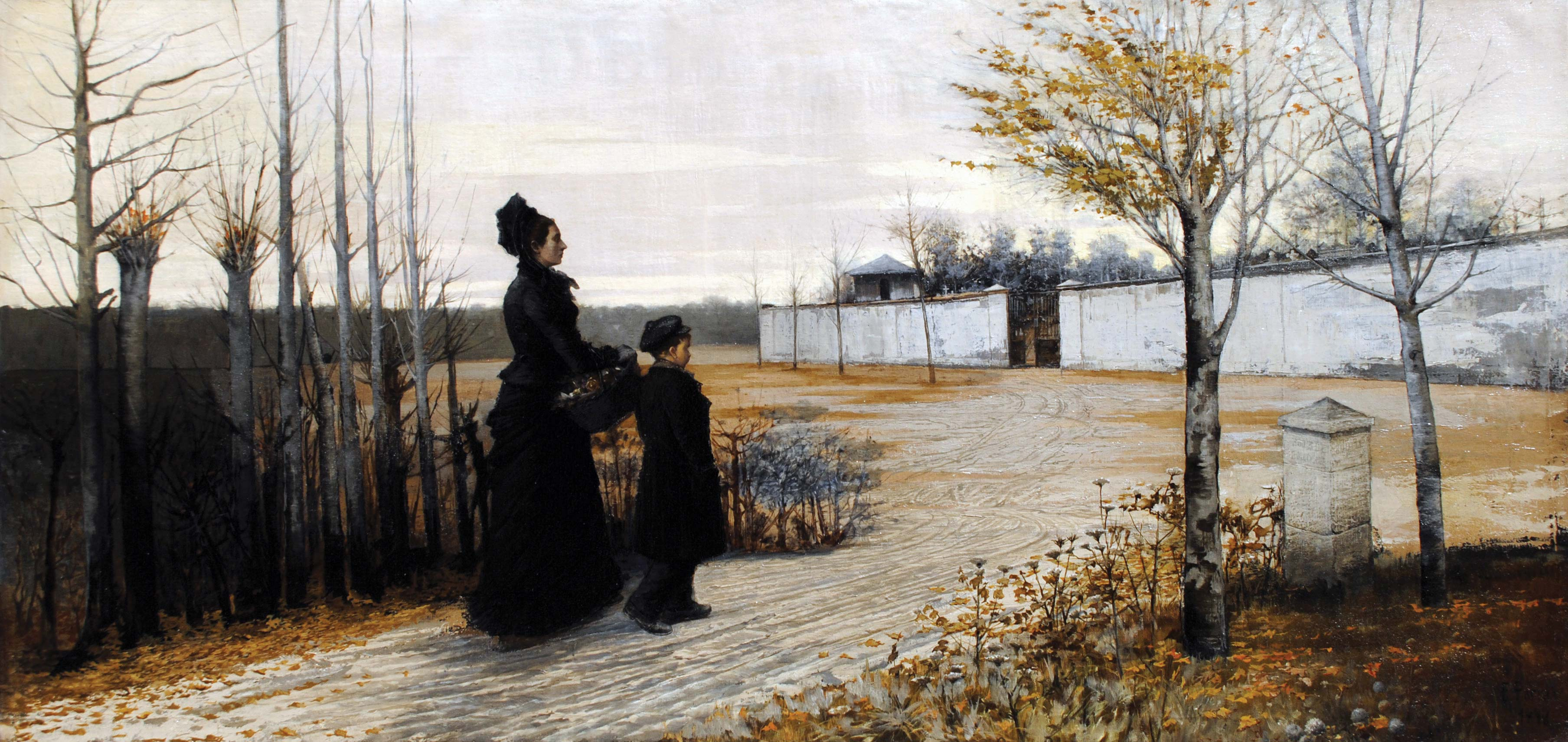
Solos ("Alone", Oil on Canvas, 1898). Held at the Museo Nacional de Arte.

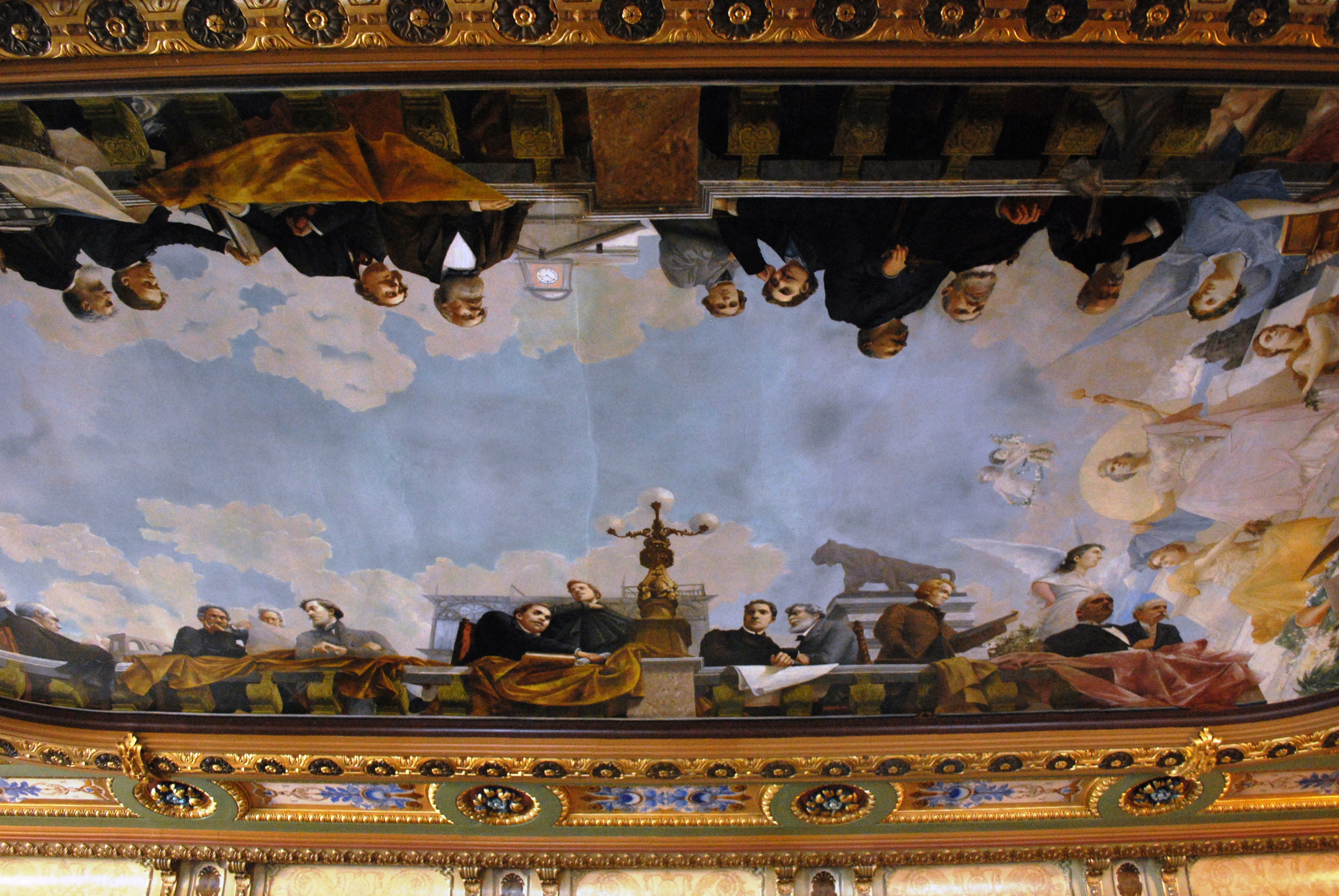
Part of the ceiling fresco painted by Felix Parra in 1893 in the Salon de Cabildos of the Palacio de Ayuntamiento (Old Town Hall) of Mexico City

== See also ==
- Academy of San Carlos
