= Bartolomé de las Casas =

Spanish Catholic clergyman and writer (1484–1566)

Servant of God Bartolomé de las Casas y Sosa OP
- Bishop of Chiapas
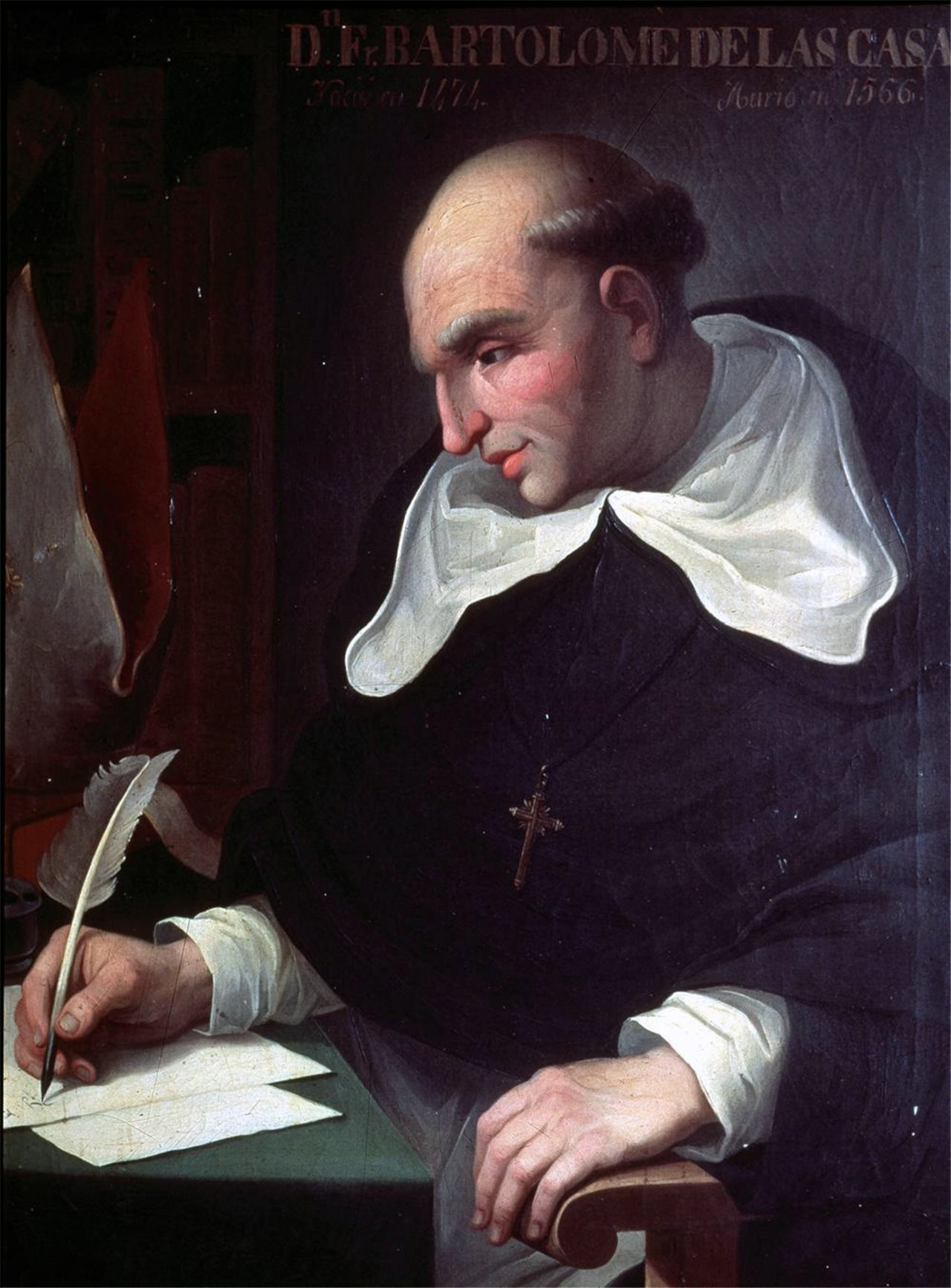
- Province: Tuxtla Gutiérrez
- See: Chiapas
- Installed: 13 March 1544
- Term ended: 11 September 1550
- Other post: Protector of the Indians

Orders
- Ordination: 1510
- Consecration: 30 March 1554 by Bishop Diego de Loaysa, O.R.S.A.

Personal details
- Born: Bartolomé de las Casas; 11 November 1484 Seville, Crown of Castile
- Died: 18 July 1566 (aged 81) Madrid, Spain
- Buried: Basilica of Our Lady of Atocha, Madrid, Spain
- Denomination: Catholic Church
- Occupation: Encomienda owner, priest, missionary, bishop, writer, polemicist, abolitionist.
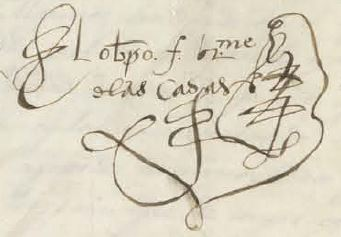
- Signature: Bartolomé de las Casas y Sosa's signature

Bartolomé de las Casas, OP (US: /lɑːs ˈkɑːsəs/ lahss KAH-səss; Spanish pronunciation: [baɾtoloˈme ðe las ˈkasas]); 11 November 1484 – 18 July 1566) was a Spanish lawyer, clergyman, writer, and activist best known for his work as a historian and social reformer. He arrived in Hispaniola as a layman, then became a Dominican friar. He was appointed as the first resident Bishop of Chiapas, and the first officially appointed "Protector of the Indians". His extensive writings, the most famous being A Short Account of the Destruction of the Indies and Historia de Las Indias, chronicle the first decades of colonization of the Caribbean islands. He described and railed against the atrocities committed by the conquistadores against the Indigenous peoples.

Arriving as one of the first Spanish settlers in the Americas, De Las Casas initially participated in the colonial economy built on forced Indigenous labor, but eventually felt compelled to oppose the abuses committed by European colonists against the Indigenous population. In 1515 he gave up his Indigenous Caribbean laborers and encomienda. He then advocated, before Charles V, on behalf of rights for the Natives. In his early writings, he advocated the use of African slaves to replace Indigenous labor. He did so without knowing that the Portuguese were carrying out "brutal and unjust wars in the name of spreading the faith". Later in life, he retracted this position, as he regarded both forms of slavery as equally wrong.

In 1522, De Las Casas tried to launch a new kind of peaceful colonialism on the coast of Venezuela, but this venture failed. He then entered the Dominican Order and became a friar, leaving public life for a decade. He traveled to Central America, acting as a missionary among the Maya of Guatemala and participating in debates among colonial churchmen about how best to bring the Natives to the Christian faith.

Travelling back to Spain to recruit more missionaries, he continued lobbying for the abolition of the encomienda, gaining an important victory by the passage of the New Laws in 1542. He was appointed Bishop of Chiapas, but served only for a short time before he was forced to return to Spain because of resistance to the New Laws by the encomenderos, and conflicts with Spanish settlers because of his pro-Indian policies and activist religious stance. He served in the Spanish court for the remainder of his life; there he held great influence over Indies-related issues. In 1550, he participated in the Valladolid debate, in which Juan Ginés de Sepúlveda argued that the Indians were less than human, and required Spanish masters to become civilized. De Las Casas maintained that they were fully human, and that forcefully subjugating them was unjustifiable.

De Las Casas spent 50 years of his life actively fighting slavery and the colonial abuse of Indigenous peoples, especially by trying to convince the Spanish court to adopt a more humane policy of colonization. Although he did not completely succeed in changing Spanish views on colonization, his efforts did result in improvement of the legal status of the Natives, and in an increased colonial focus on the ethics of colonialism.

Following his death in 1566, De Las Casas was widely venerated as a holy figure, resulting in the opening of his cause for beatification in the Catholic Church.

== Life and times ==
=== Background and arrival in the New World ===
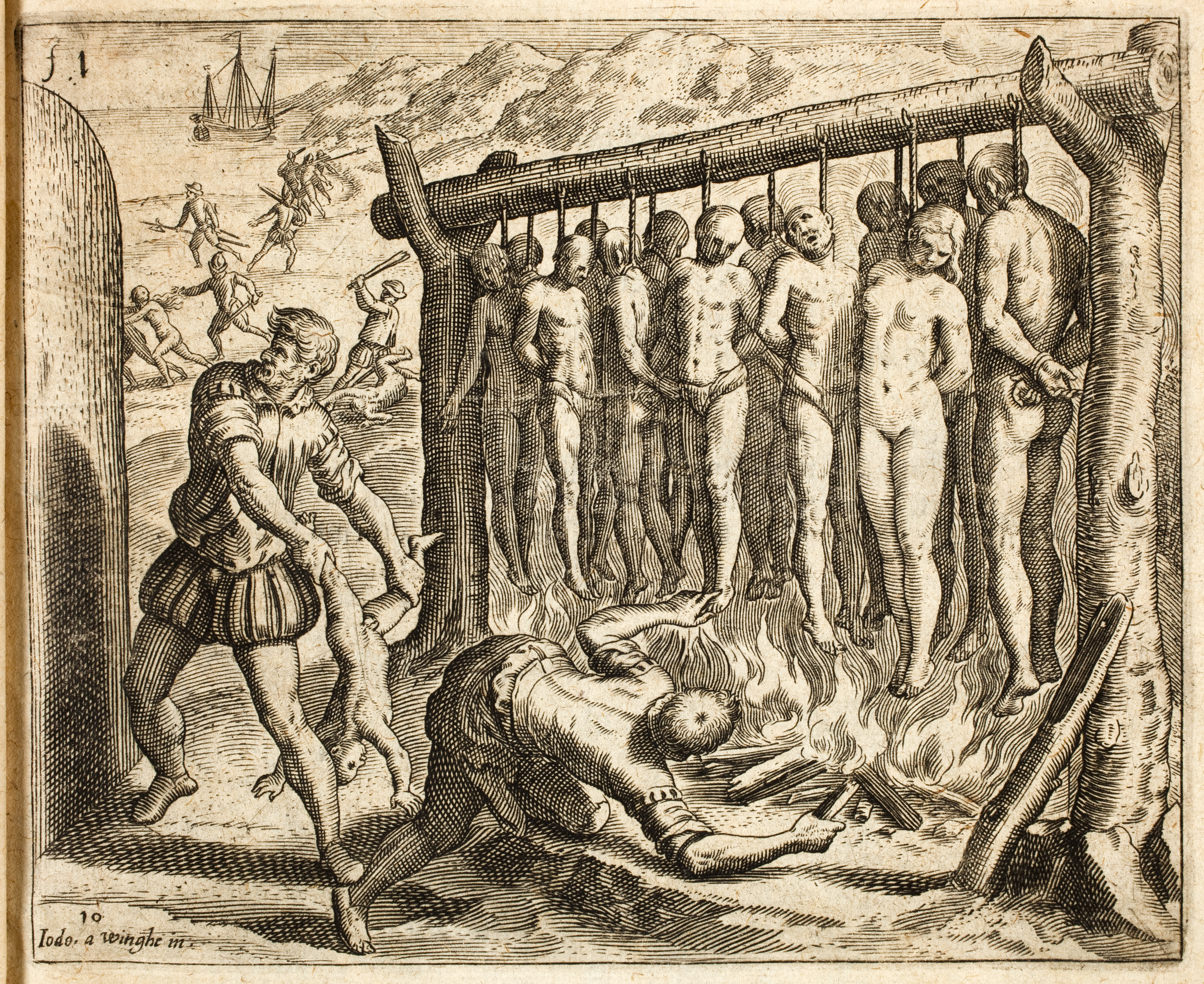
Depiction of Spanish atrocities committed in the conquest of Cuba in Las Casas's Brevisima relación de la destrucción de las Indias. The print was made by two Flemish artists who had fled the Southern Netherlands because of their Protestant faith: Joos van Winghe was the designer and Theodor de Bry the engraver.

Bartolomé de las Casas was born in Seville on 11 November 1484. For centuries, De Las Casas's birthdate was believed to be 1474; however, in the 1970s, scholars conducting archival work demonstrated this to be an error, after uncovering in the Archivo General de Indias records of a contemporary lawsuit that demonstrated he was born a decade later than had been supposed. Subsequent biographers and authors have generally accepted and reflected this revision. His father, Pedro de las Casas, a merchant, descended from one of the families that had migrated from France to found the Christian Seville; his family also spelled the name Casaus. According to one biographer, his family was of converso heritage, although others refer to them as ancient Christians who migrated from France. Following the testimony of De Las Casas's biographer Antonio de Remesal, tradition has it that De Las Casas studied a licentiate at Salamanca, but De Las Casas does not say so in his own writings.

De Las Casas's first encounter with Indigenous peoples happened before he even sailed to the Americas. In his Historia de las Indias, he wrote of Christopher Columbus's return to Seville, in 1493. De Las Casas recorded having seen "seven Indians" in the entourage of Christopher Columbus, being exhibited in the vicinity of the Iglesia de San Nicolás de Bari, along with "beautiful green parrots, vibrant in color" and Indigenous artifacts. Pedro de Las Casas, Bartolomé's merchant father, left in Columbus's second expedition. Upon his return, in 1499, Pedro de Las Casas brought to his son "a young Amerinidian."

Three years later, in 1502, De Las Casas immigrated with his father to the island of Hispaniola, on the expedition of Nicolás de Ovando. De Las Casas became an hacendado and slave owner, receiving a piece of land in the province of Cibao. He participated in slave raids and military expeditions against the Native population of Hispaniola. In 1506, he returned to Spain and completed his studies of canon law at Salamanca. That same year, he was ordained a deacon and then traveled to Rome, where he was ordained a secular priest in 1507.

In September 1510, a group of Dominican friars arrived in Santo Domingo led by Pedro de Córdoba; appalled by the injustices they saw committed by the slave owners against the Indians, they decided to deny slave owners the right to confession. De Las Casas was among those denied confession for this reason. In December 1511, a Dominican preacher Fray Antonio de Montesinos preached a fiery sermon that implicated the colonists in the genocide of the Native peoples. He is said to have preached: "Tell me by what right of justice do you hold these Indians in such a cruel and horrible servitude? On what authority have you waged such detestable wars against these people who dealt quietly and peacefully on their own lands? Wars in which you have destroyed such an infinite number of them by homicides and slaughters never heard of before. Why do you keep them so oppressed and exhausted, without giving them enough to eat or curing them of the sicknesses they incur from the excessive labor you give them, and they die, or rather you kill them, in order to extract and acquire gold every day." De Las Casas himself argued against the Dominicans in favor of the justice of the encomienda. The colonists, led by Diego Columbus, dispatched a complaint against the Dominicans to the King, and the Dominicans were recalled from Hispaniola.

=== Conquest of Cuba and change of heart ===
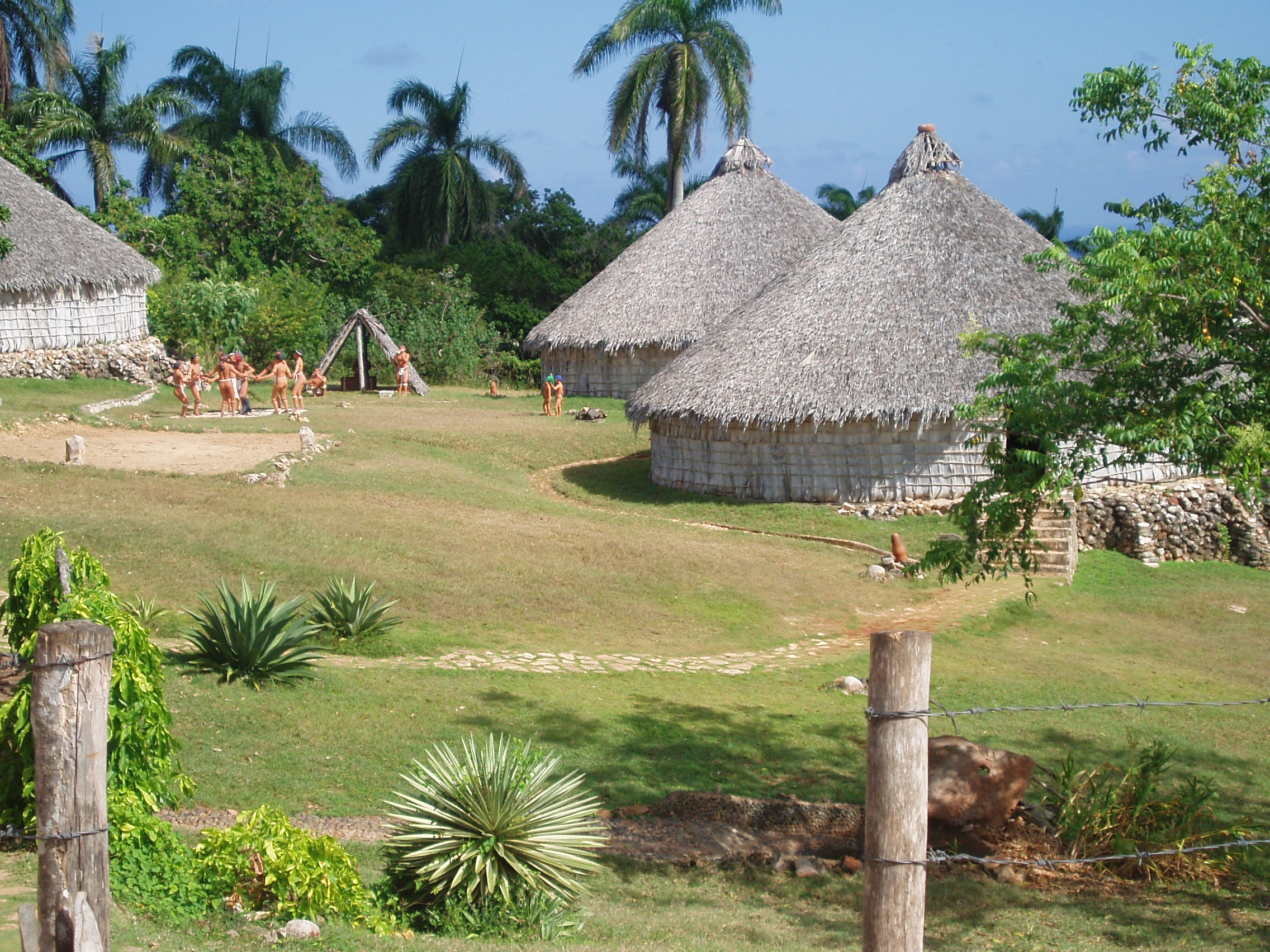
Reconstruction of a Taíno village from Las Casas's times in contemporary Cuba

In 1513, as a chaplain, De Las Casas participated in Diego Velázquez de Cuéllar's and Pánfilo de Narváez' conquest of Cuba. He participated in campaigns at Bayamo and Camagüey and in the massacre of Hatuey. He witnessed many atrocities committed by Spaniards against the Native Ciboney and Guanahatabey peoples. He later wrote: "I saw here cruelty on a scale no living being has ever seen or expects to see." De Las Casas and his friend Pedro de la Rentería were awarded a joint encomienda which was rich in gold and slaves, located on the Arimao River close to Cienfuegos. During the next few years, he divided his time between being a colonist and his duties as an ordained priest.

In 1514, De Las Casas was studying a passage in the book Ecclesiasticus (Sirach) 34:18–22 (Note: "If one sacrifices from what has been wrongfully obtained, the offering is blemished; the gifts of the lawless are not acceptable. ... Like one who kills a son before his father's eyes is the man who offers sacrifice from the property of the poor. The bread of the needy is the life of the poor; whoever deprives them of it is a man of blood." quoted from Brading (1997:119–120).) for a Pentecost sermon and pondering its meaning. De Las Casas was finally convinced that all the actions of the Spanish in the New World had been illegal and that they constituted a great injustice. He made up his mind to give up his slaves and encomienda, and started to preach that other colonists should do the same. When his preaching met with resistance, he realized that he would have to go to Spain to fight there against the enslavement and abuse of the Native people. Aided by Pedro de Córdoba and accompanied by Antonio de Montesinos, he left for Spain in September 1515, arriving in Seville in November.

=== De Las Casas and King Ferdinand ===
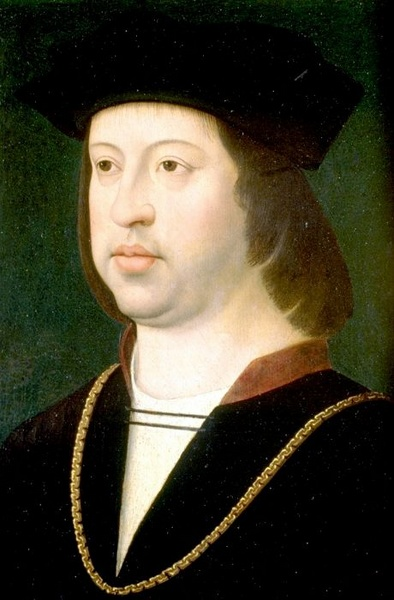
A contemporary painting of King Ferdinand "The Catholic"

De Las Casas arrived in Spain with the plan of convincing the King to end the encomienda system. This was easier thought than done, as most of the people who were in positions of power were themselves either encomenderos or otherwise profiting from the influx of wealth from the Indies. In the winter of 1515, King Ferdinand lay ill in Plasencia, but De Las Casas was able to get a letter of introduction to the king from the Archbishop of Seville, Diego de Deza. On Christmas Eve of 1515, De Las Casas met the monarch and discussed the situation in the Indies with him; the king agreed to hear him out in more detail at a later date. While waiting, De Las Casas produced a report that he presented to the Bishop of Burgos, Juan Rodríguez de Fonseca, and secretary Lope Conchillos, who were functionaries in complete charge of the royal policies regarding the Indies; both were encomenderos. They were not impressed by his account, and De Las Casas had to find a different avenue of change. He put his faith in his coming audience with the king, but it never came, for King Ferdinand died on 25 January 1516.

The regency of Castile passed on to Ximenez Cisneros and Adrian of Utrecht who were guardians for the under-age Prince Charles. De Las Casas was resolved to see Prince Charles who resided in Flanders, but on his way there he passed Madrid and delivered to the regents a written account of the situation in the Indies and his proposed remedies. This was his "Memorial de Remedios para Las Indias" of 1516. In this early work, De Las Casas advocated importing black slaves from Africa to relieve the suffering Indians, a stance he later retracted, becoming an advocate for the Africans in the colonies as well. (Note: Las Casas's retraction of his views on African slavery is expressed particularly in chapters 102 and 129, Book III of his Historia.) This shows that De Las Casas's first concern was not to end slavery as an institution, but to end the physical abuse and suffering of the Indians. In keeping with the legal and moral doctrine of the time, De Las Casas believed that slavery could be justified if it was the result of Just War, and at the time he assumed that the enslavement of Africans was justified. Worried by De Las Casas's descriptions of the situation in the Indies, Cardinal Cisneros decided to send a group of Hieronymite monks to take over the government of the islands.

=== Protector of the Indians ===
Three Hieronymite monks, Luis de Figueroa, Bernardino de Manzanedo, and Alonso de Santo Domingo, were selected as commissioners to take over the authority of the Indies. De Las Casas had a considerable part in selecting them and writing the instructions under which their new government would be instated, largely based on Las Casas's memorial. De Las Casas himself was granted the official title of Protector of the Indians, and given a yearly salary of one hundred pesos. In this new office De Las Casas was expected to serve as an advisor to the new governors with regard to Indian issues, to speak the case of the Indians in court, and send reports back to Spain. De Las Casas and the commissioners traveled to Santo Domingo on separate ships, and De Las Casas arrived two weeks later than the Hieronimytes. During this time the Hieronimytes had time to form a more pragmatic view of the situation than the one advocated by De Las Casas; their position was precarious as every encomendero on the Islands was fiercely against any attempts to curtail their use of Native labor. Consequently, the commissioners were unable to take any radical steps towards improving the situation of the Natives. They did revoke some encomiendas from Spaniards, especially those who were living in Spain and not on the islands themselves; they even repossessed the encomienda of Fonseca, the Bishop of Burgos. They also carried out an inquiry into the Indian question at which all the encomenderos asserted that the Indians were quite incapable of living freely without their supervision. De Las Casas was disappointed and infuriated. When he accused the Hieronymites of being complicit in kidnapping Indians, the relationship between De Las Casas and the commissioners broke down. De Las Casas had become a hated figure by Spaniards all over the islands, and he had to seek refuge in the Dominican monastery. The Dominicans had been the first to indict the encomenderos, and they continued to chastise them and refuse the absolution of confession to slave owners, and even stated that priests who took their confession were committing a mortal sin. In May 1517, De Las Casas was forced to travel back to Spain to denounce to the regent the failure of the Hieronymite reforms. Only after De Las Casas had left did the Hieronymites begin to congregate Indians into towns similar to what De Las Casas had wanted.

=== De Las Casas and Emperor Charles V: The peasant colonization scheme ===
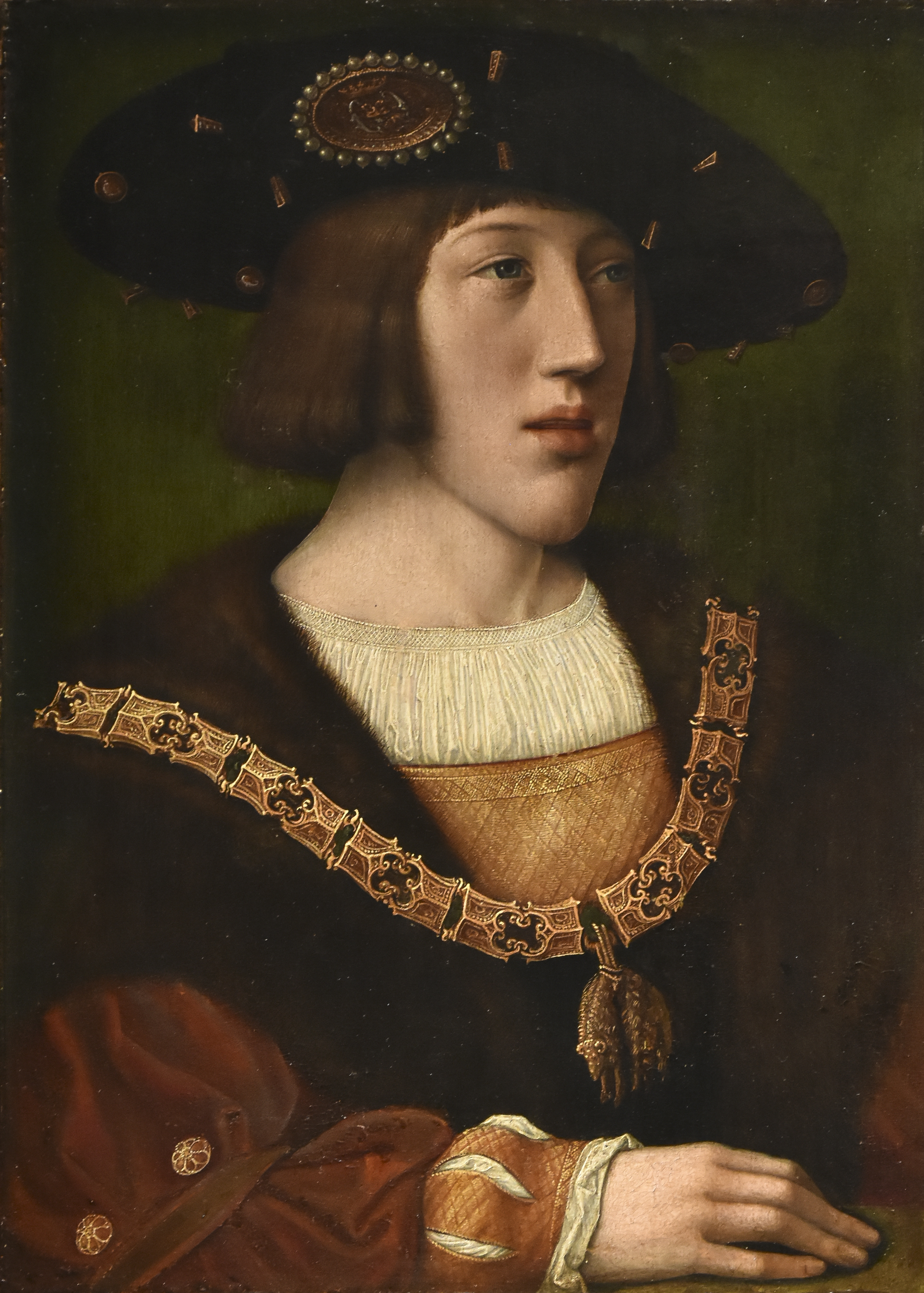
Contemporary portrait of the young Emperor Charles V

When he arrived in Spain, his former protector, regent, and Cardinal Ximenez Cisneros, was ill and had become tired of De Las Casas's tenacity. De Las Casas resolved to meet instead with the young king Charles I. Ximenez died on 8 November, and the young King arrived in Valladolid on 25 November 1517. De Las Casas managed to secure the support of the king's Flemish courtiers, including the powerful Chancellor Jean de la Sauvage. De Las Casas's influence turned the favor of the court against Secretary Conchillos and Bishop Fonseca. Sauvage spoke highly of De Las Casas to the king, who appointed De Las Casas and Sauvage to write a new plan for reforming the governmental system of the Indies.

De Las Casas suggested a plan where the encomienda would be abolished and Indians would be congregated into self-governing townships to become tribute-paying vassals of the king. He still suggested that the loss of Indian labor for the colonists could be replaced by allowing importation of African slaves. Another important part of the plan was to introduce a new kind of sustainable colonization, and De Las Casas advocated supporting the migration of Spanish peasants to the Indies where they would introduce small-scale farming and agriculture, a kind of colonization that did not rely on resource depletion and Indian labor. De Las Casas worked to recruit a large number of peasants who would want to travel to the islands, where they would be given lands to farm, cash advances, and the tools and resources they needed to establish themselves there. The recruitment drive was difficult, and during the process the power relation shifted at court when Chancellor Sauvage, De Las Casas's main supporter, unexpectedly died. In the end a much smaller number of peasant families were sent than originally planned, and they were supplied with insufficient provisions and no support secured for their arrival. Those who survived the journey were ill-received, and had to work hard even to survive in the hostile colonies. De Las Casas was devastated by the tragic result of his peasant migration scheme, which he felt had been thwarted by his enemies. He decided instead to undertake a personal venture which would not rely on the support of others, and fought to win a land grant on the American mainland which was in its earliest stage of colonization.

=== The Cumaná venture ===
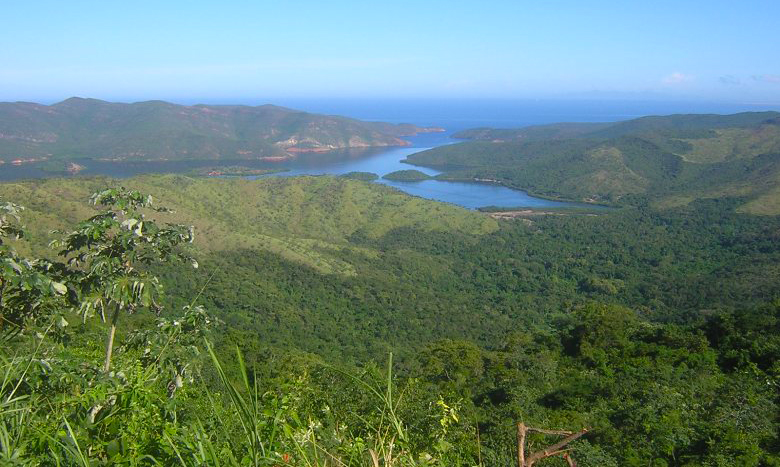
View over the landscape of Mochima National Park in Venezuela, close to the original location of Las Casas's colony at Cumaná

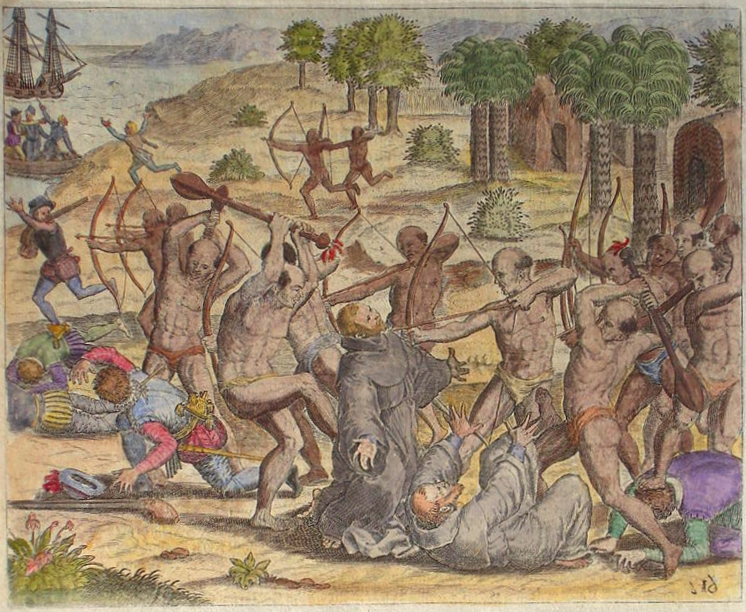
The Natives of Cumaná attack the mission after Gonzalo de Ocampo's slaving raid. Colored copperplate by Theodor de Bry, published in the "Relación brevissima"

Following a suggestion by his friend and mentor Pedro de Córdoba, De Las Casas petitioned a land grant to be allowed to establish a settlement in northern Venezuela at Cumaná. Founded in 1515, there was already a small Franciscan monastery in Cumana, and a Dominican one at Chiribichi, but the monks there were being harassed by Spaniards operating slave raids from the nearby Island of Cubagua. To make the proposal palatable to the king, De Las Casas had to incorporate the prospect of profits for the royal treasury. He suggested fortifying the northern coast of Venezuela, establishing ten royal forts to protect the Indians and starting up a system of trade in gold and pearls. All the Indian slaves of the New World should be brought to live in these towns and become tribute paying subjects to the king. To secure the grant, De Las Casas had to go through a long court fight against Bishop Fonseca and his supporters Gonzalo de Oviedo and Bishop Quevedo of Tierra Firme. De Las Casas's supporters were Diego Columbus and the new chancellor Gattinara. De Las Casas's enemies slandered him to the king, accusing him of planning to escape with the money to Genoa or Rome. In 1520 De Las Casas's concession was finally granted, but it was a much smaller grant than he had initially proposed; he was also denied the possibilities of extracting gold and pearls, which made it difficult for him to find investors for the venture. De Las Casas committed himself to producing 15,000 ducats of annual revenue, increasing to 60,000 after ten years, and to erecting three Christian towns of at least 40 settlers each. Some privileges were also granted to the initial 50 shareholders in De Las Casas's scheme. The king also promised not to give any encomienda grants in De Las Casas's area. That said, finding fifty men willing to invest 200 ducats each and three years of unpaid work proved impossible for De Las Casas. He ended up leaving in November 1520 with just a small group of peasants, paying for the venture with money borrowed from his brother in-law.

Arriving in Puerto Rico, in January 1521, he received the terrible news that the Dominican convent at Chiribichi had been sacked by Indians, and that the Spaniards of the islands had launched a punitive expedition, led by Gonzalo de Ocampo, into the very heart of the territory that De Las Casas wanted to colonize peacefully. The Indians had been provoked to attack the settlement of the monks because of the repeated slave raids by Spaniards operating from Cubagua. As Ocampo's ships began returning with slaves from the land De Las Casas had been granted, he went to Hispaniola to complain to the Audiencia. After several months of negotiations De Las Casas set sail alone; the peasants he had brought had deserted, and he arrived in his colony already ravaged by Spaniards.

De Las Casas worked there in adverse conditions for the following months, being constantly harassed by the Spanish pearl fishers of Cubagua island who traded slaves for alcohol with the Natives. Early in 1522, De Las Casas left the settlement to complain to the authorities. While he was gone the Native Caribs attacked the settlement of Cumaná, burned it to the ground, and killed four of De Las Casas's men. He returned to Hispaniola in January 1522, and heard the news of the massacre. The rumours even included him among the dead. To make matters worse, his detractors used the event as evidence of the need to pacify the Indians using military means.

=== De Las Casas as a Dominican friar ===
Devastated, De Las Casas reacted by entering the Dominican monastery of Santa Cruz in Santo Domingo as a novice in 1522 and finally taking holy vows as a Dominican friar in 1523. There he continued his theological studies, being particularly attracted to Thomist philosophy. He oversaw the construction of a monastery in Puerto Plata on the north coast of Hispaniola, subsequently serving as prior of the convent. In 1527 he began working on his History of the Indies, in which he reported much of what he had witnessed first hand in the conquest and colonization of New Spain. In 1531, he wrote a letter to Garcia Manrique, Count of Osorno, protesting again the mistreatment of the Indians and advocating a return to his original reform plan of 1516. In 1531, a complaint was sent by the encomenderos of Hispaniola that De Las Casas was again accusing them of mortal sins from the pulpit. In 1533 he contributed to the establishment of a peace treaty between the Spanish and the rebel Taíno band of chief Enriquillo. In 1534, De Las Casas made an attempt to travel to Peru to observe the first stages of conquest of that region by Francisco Pizarro. His party made it as far as Panama, but had to turn back to Nicaragua due to adverse weather. Lingering for a while in the Dominican convent of Granada, he got into conflict with Rodrigo de Contreras, Governor of Nicaragua, when De Las Casas vehemently opposed slaving expeditions by the Governor. In 1536, De Las Casas followed a number of friars to Guatemala, where they began to prepare to undertake a mission among the Maya Indians. They stayed in the convent founded some years earlier by Fray Domingo Betanzos and studied the Kʼicheʼ language with Bishop Francisco Marroquín, before traveling into the interior region called Tuzulutlan, "The Land of War", in 1537.

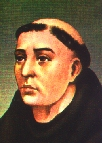
Toribio de Benavente "Motolinia", Las Casas's Franciscan adversary.

Also in 1536, before venturing into Tuzulutlan, De Las Casas went to Oaxaca, Mexico, to participate in a series of discussions and debates among the bishops of the Dominican and Franciscan orders. The two orders had very different approaches to the conversion of the Indians. The Franciscans used a method of mass conversion, sometimes baptizing many thousands of Indians in a day. This method was championed by prominent Franciscans such as Toribio de Benavente, known as "Motolinia", and De Las Casas made many enemies among the Franciscans for arguing that conversions made without adequate understanding were invalid. De Las Casas wrote a treatise called "De unico vocationis modo" (On the Only Way of Conversion) based on the missionary principles he had used in Guatemala. Motolinia would later be a fierce critic of De Las Casas, accusing him of being all talk and no action when it came to converting the Indians. As a direct result of the debates between the Dominicans and Franciscans and spurred on by De Las Casas's treatise, Pope Paul III promulgated the Bull Sublimis Deus, which stated that the Indians were rational beings and should be brought peacefully to the faith as such.

De Las Casas returned to Guatemala in 1537 wanting to employ his new method of conversion based on two principles: 1) to preach the Gospel to all men and treat them as equals, and 2) to assert that conversion must be voluntary and based on knowledge and understanding of the faith. It was important for De Las Casas that this method be tested without meddling from secular colonists, so he chose a territory in the heart of Guatemala where there were no previous colonies and where the Natives were considered fierce and war-like. Because the land had not been possible to conquer by military means, the governor of Guatemala, Alonso de Maldonado, agreed to sign a contract promising that if the venture was successful he would not establish any new encomiendas in the area. De Las Casas's group of friars established a Dominican presence in Rabinal, Sacapulas, and Cobán. Through the efforts of De Las Casas's missionaries the so-called "Land of War" came to be called "Verapaz", "True Peace". De Las Casas's strategy was to teach Christian songs to merchant Indian Christians who then ventured into the area. In this way he was successful in converting several Native chiefs, among them those of Atitlán and Chichicastenango, and in building several churches in the territory named Alta Verapaz. These congregated a group of Christian Indians in the location of what is now the town of Rabinal. In 1538 Las Casas was recalled from his mission by Bishop Marroquín who wanted him to go to Mexico and then on to Spain to seek more Dominicans to assist in the mission. De Las Casas left Guatemala for Mexico, where he stayed for more than a year before setting out for Spain in 1540.

=== The New Laws ===
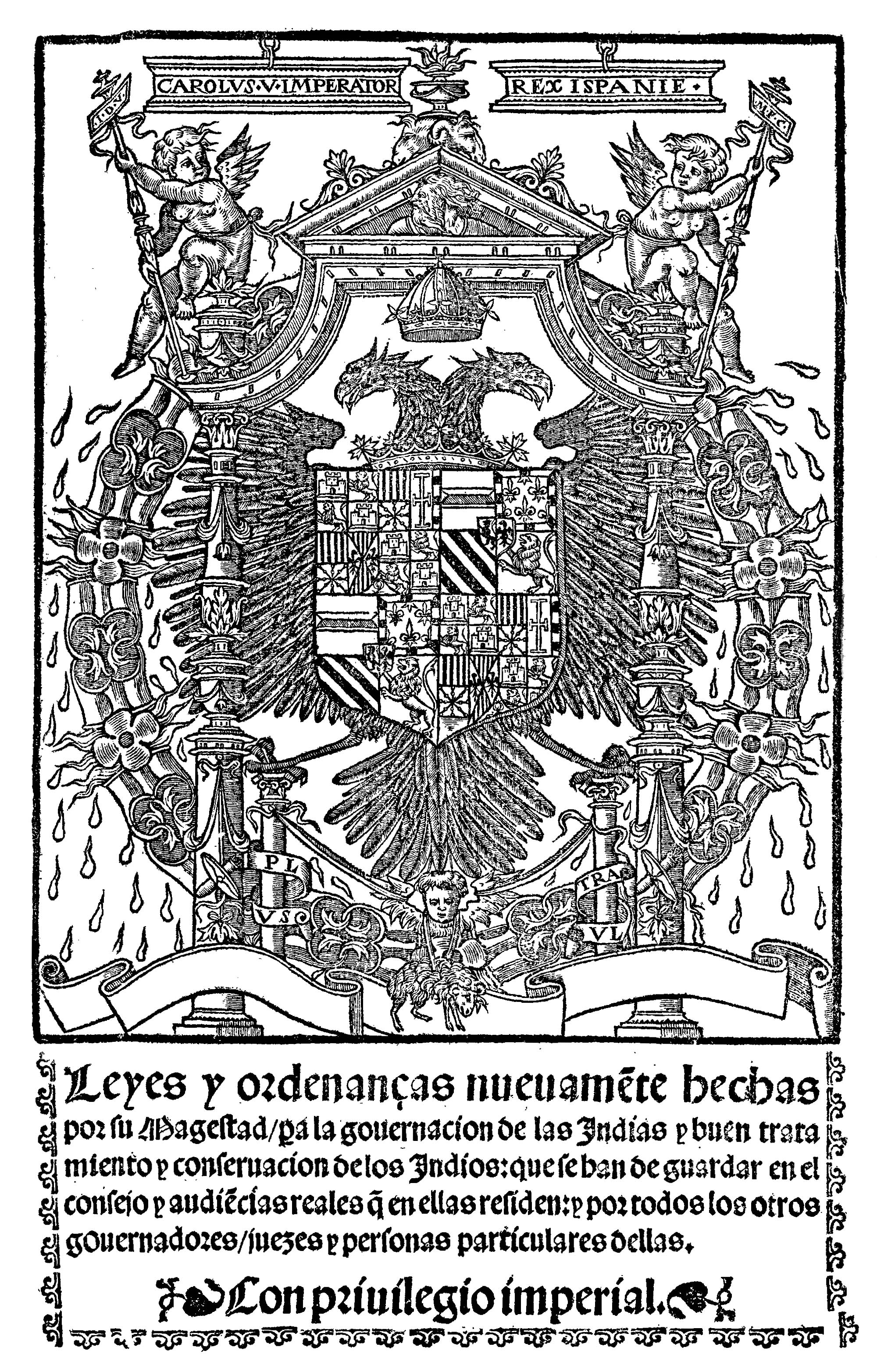
Cover of the New Laws of 1542

In Spain, De Las Casas started securing official support for the Guatemalan mission, and he managed to get a royal decree forbidding secular intrusion into the Verapaces for the following five years. He also informed the Theologians of Salamanca, led by Francisco de Vitoria, of the mass baptism practiced by the Franciscans, resulting in a dictum condemning the practice as sacrilegious.

But apart from the clerical business, De Las Casas had also traveled to Spain for his own purpose: to continue the struggle against the colonists' mistreatment of the Indians. The encomienda had, in fact, legally been abolished in 1523, but it had been reinstituted in 1526, and in 1530 a general ordinance against slavery was reversed by the Crown. For this reason it was a pressing matter for Bartolomé de las Casas to plead once again for the Indians with Charles V who was by now Holy Roman Emperor and no longer a boy. He wrote a letter asking for permission to stay in Spain a little longer to argue for the emperor that conversion and colonization were best achieved by peaceful means.

When the hearings started in 1542, De Las Casas presented a narrative of atrocities against the Natives of the Indies that would later be published in 1552 as A Short Account of the Destruction of the Indies. Before a council consisting of Cardinal García de Loaysa, the Count of Osorno, Bishop Fuenleal, and several members of the Council of the Indies, De Las Casas argued that the only solution to the problem was to remove all Indians from the care of secular Spaniards, by abolishing the encomienda system and putting them instead directly under the Crown as royal tribute-paying subjects. On 20 November 1542, the emperor signed the New Laws abolishing the encomiendas and removing certain officials from the Council of the Indies. The New Laws made it illegal to use Indians as carriers, except where no other transport was available, it prohibited all taking of Indians as slaves, and it instated a gradual abolition of the encomienda system, with each encomienda reverting to the Crown at the death of its holders. It also exempted the few surviving Indians of Hispaniola, Cuba, Puerto Rico, and Jamaica from tribute and all requirements of personal service. However, the reforms were so unpopular in the New World that riots broke out and threats were made against De Las Casas's life. The Viceroy of New Spain, himself an encomendero, decided not to implement the laws in his domain, and instead sent a party to Spain to argue against the laws on behalf of the encomenderos. De Las Casas himself was also not satisfied with the laws, as they were not drastic enough and the encomienda system was going to function for many years still under the gradual abolition plan. He drafted a suggestion for an amendment arguing that the laws against slavery were formulated in such a way that it presupposed that violent conquest would still be carried out, and he encouraged once again beginning a phase of peaceful colonization by peasants instead of soldiers.

=== Bishop of Chiapas ===
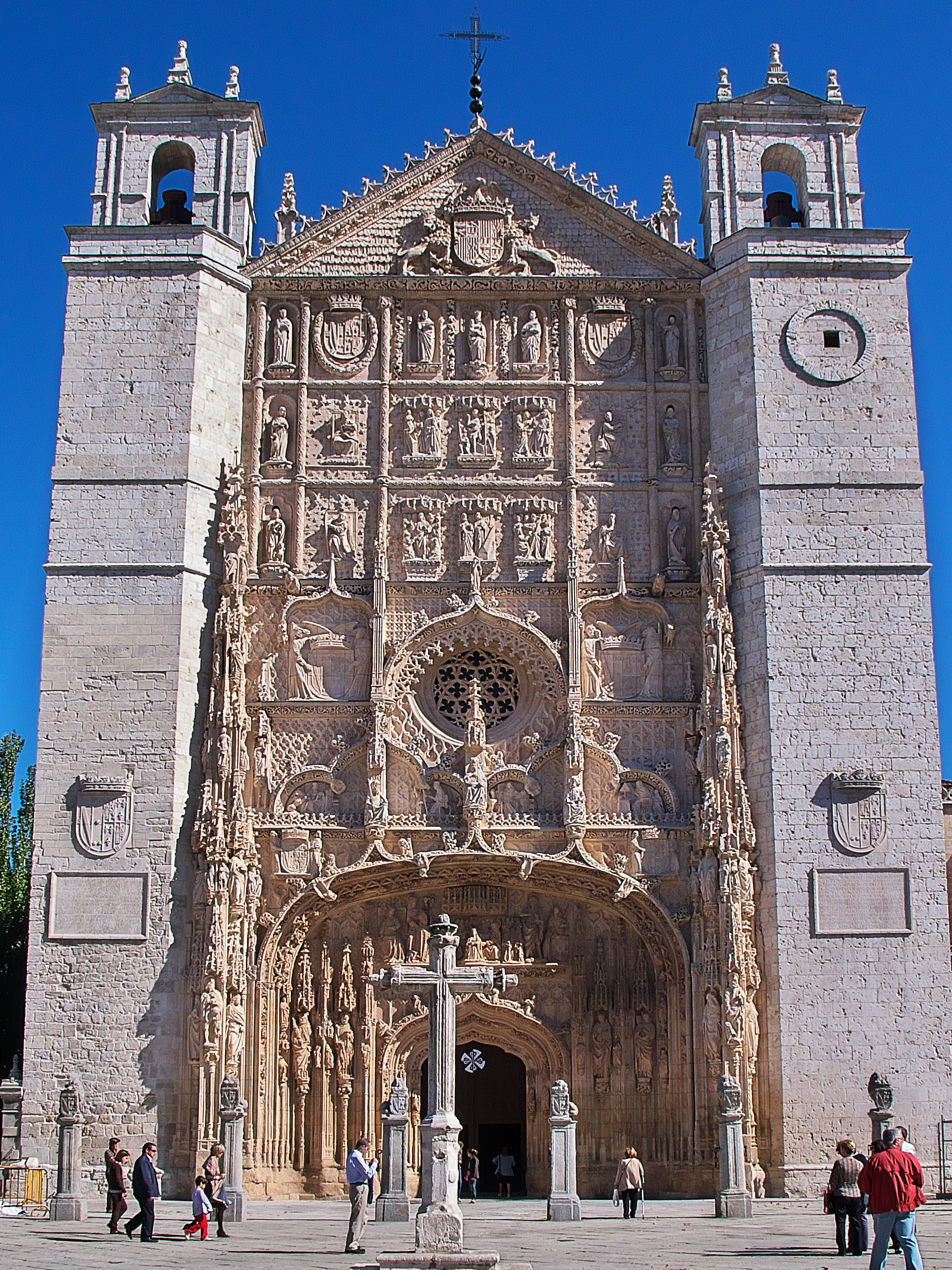
The Church of the Dominican Convent of San Pablo in Valladolid where Bartolomé de Las Casas was consecrated as Bishop on March 30, 1544.

Before De Las Casas returned to Spain, he was also appointed as Bishop of Chiapas, a newly established diocese of which he took possession in 1545 upon his return to the New World. He was consecrated in the Dominican Church of San Pablo on 30 March 1544. As Archbishop Loaysa strongly disliked De Las Casas, the ceremony was officiated by Loaysa's nephew, Diego de Loaysa, Bishop of Modruš, with Pedro Torres, Titular Bishop of Arbanum, and Cristóbal de Pedraza, Bishop of Comayagua, as co-consecrators. As a bishop, De Las Casas was involved in frequent conflicts with the encomenderos and secular laity of his diocese: among the landowners there was the conquistador Bernal Díaz del Castillo. In a pastoral letter issued on 20 March 1545, De Las Casas refused absolution to slave owners and encomenderos even on their death bed, unless all their slaves had been set free and their property returned to them. De Las Casas furthermore threatened that anyone who mistreated Indians within his jurisdiction would be excommunicated. He also came into conflict with the Bishop of Guatemala Francisco Marroquín, to whose jurisdiction the diocese had previously belonged. To De Las Casas's dismay Bishop Marroquín openly defied the New Laws. While bishop, De Las Casas was the principal consecrator of Antonio de Valdivieso, Bishop of Nicaragua (1544).

The New Laws were finally repealed on 20 October 1545, and riots broke out against De Las Casas, with shots being fired against him by angry colonists. After a year he had made himself so unpopular among the Spaniards of the area that he had to leave. Having been summoned to a meeting among the bishops of New Spain to be held in Mexico City on 12 January 1546, he left his diocese, never to return. At the meeting, probably after lengthy reflection, and realizing that the New Laws were lost in Mexico, De Las Casas presented a moderated view on the problems of confession and restitution of property, Archbishop Juan de Zumárraga of Mexico and Bishop Julián Garcés of Puebla agreed completely with his new moderate stance, Bishop Vasco de Quiroga of Michoacán had minor reservations, and Bishops Francisco Marroquín of Guatemala and Juan Lopez de Zárate of Oaxaca did not object. This resulted in a new resolution to be presented to viceroy Mendoza. His last act as Bishop of Chiapas was writing a confesionario, a manual for the administration of the sacrament of confession in his diocese, still refusing absolution to unrepentant encomenderos. De Las Casas appointed a vicar for his diocese and set out for Europe in December 1546, arriving in Lisbon in April 1547 and in Spain on November 1547.

=== The Valladolid debate ===
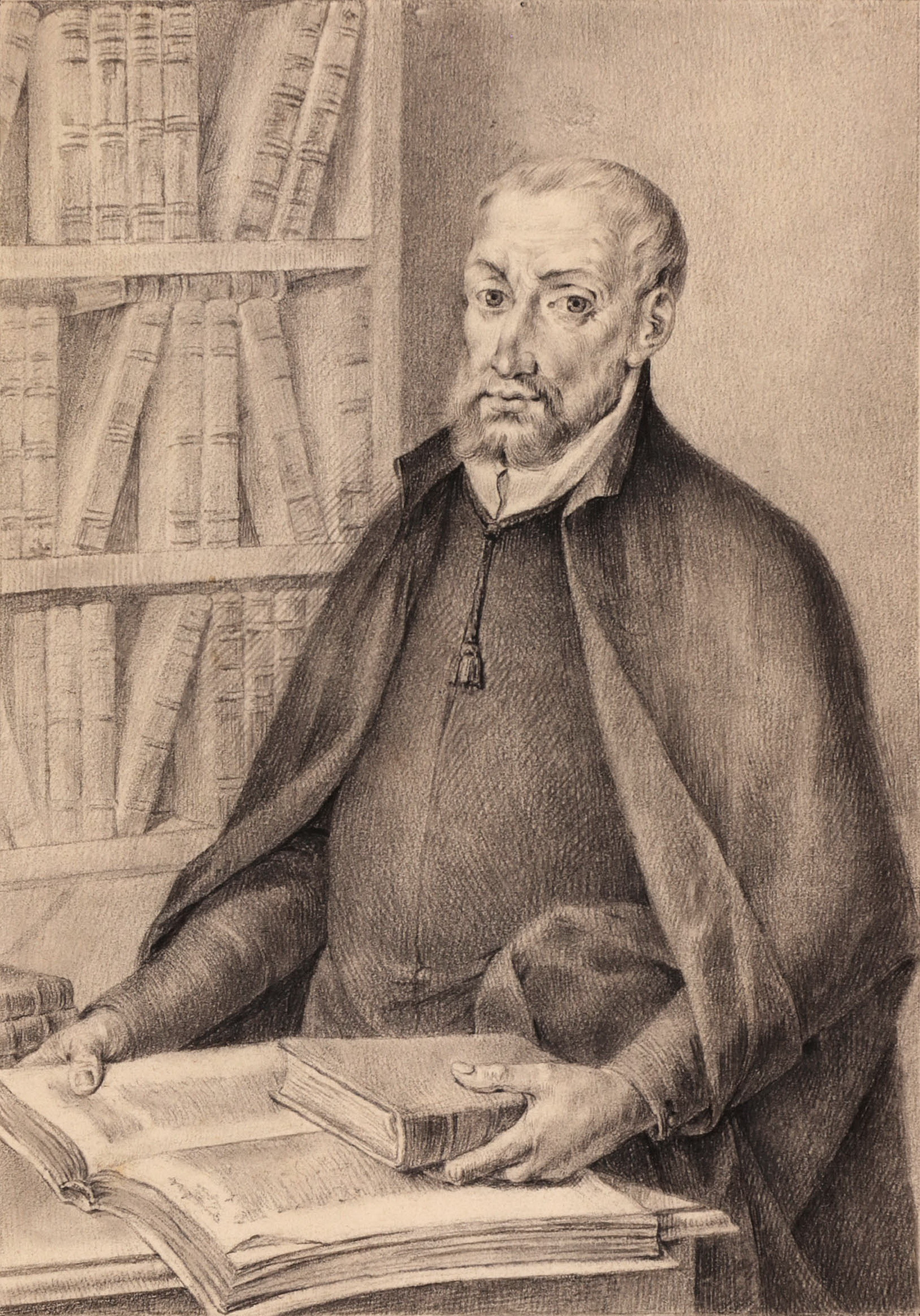
Juan Ginés de Sepúlveda, Las Casas's opponent in the Valladolid debate

De Las Casas returned to Spain, leaving behind many conflicts and unresolved issues. Arriving in Spain he was met by a barrage of accusations, many of them based on his Confesionario and its 12 rules, which many of his opponents found to be in essence a denial of the legitimacy of Spanish rule of its colonies, and hence a form of treason. The Crown had for example received a fifth of the large number of slaves taken in the recent Mixtón War, and so could not be held clean of guilt under De Las Casas's strict rules. In 1548, the Crown decreed that all copies of De Las Casas's Confesionario be burnt, and his Franciscan adversary, Motolinia, obliged and sent back a report to Spain. De Las Casas defended himself by writing two treatises on the "Just Title" – arguing that the only legality with which the Spaniards could claim titles over realms in the New World was through peaceful proselytizing. All warfare was illegal and unjust and only through the papal mandate of peacefully bringing Christianity to heathen peoples could "Just Titles" be acquired.

As a part of De Las Casas's defense by offense, he had to argue against Juan Ginés de Sepúlveda. Sepúlveda was a doctor of theology and law who, in his book Democrates Alter, sive de justis causis apud Indos (Another Democrates, or A New Democrates, or on the Just Causes of War against the Indians) had argued that some Native peoples were incapable of ruling themselves and should be pacified forcefully. The book was deemed unsound for publication by the theologians of Salamanca and Alcalá for containing unsound doctrine, but the pro-encomendero faction seized on Sepúlveda as their intellectual champion.

To settle the issues, a formal debate was organized, the famous Valladolid debate, which took place in 1550–51 with Sepúlveda and De Las Casas each presenting their arguments in front of a council of jurists and theologians. First Sepúlveda read the conclusions of his Democrates Alter, and then the council listened to De Las Casas read his counterarguments in the form of an "Apología". Sepúlveda argued that the subjugation of certain Indians was warranted because of their sins against Natural Law; that their low level of civilization required civilized masters to maintain social order; that they should be made Christian and that this in turn required them to be pacified; and that only the Spanish could defend weak Indians against the abuses of the stronger ones. De Las Casas countered that the scriptures did not in fact support war against all heathens, only against certain Canaanite tribes; that the Indians were not at all uncivilized nor lacking social order; that peaceful mission was the only true way of converting the Natives; and finally that some weak Indians suffering at the hands of stronger ones was preferable to all Indians suffering at the hands of Spaniards.

The judge, Fray Domingo de Soto, summarised the arguments. Sepúlveda addressed De Las Casas's arguments with twelve refutations, which were again countered by De Las Casas. The judges then deliberated on the arguments presented for several months before coming to a verdict. The verdict was inconclusive, and both debaters claimed that they had won.

Sepúlveda's arguments contributed to the policy of "war by fire and blood" that the Third Mexican Provincial Council implemented in 1585 during the Chichimeca War. According to Lewis Hanke, while Sepúlveda became the hero of the conquistadors, his success was short-lived, and his works were never published in Spain again during his lifetime.

De Las Casas's ideas had a more lasting impact on the decisions of the king, Philip II, as well as on history and human rights. Las Casas's criticism of the encomienda system contributed to its replacement with reducciones. His testimonies on the peaceful nature of the Indigenous peoples also encouraged nonviolent policies concerning the religious conversions of the Indians in New Spain and Peru. It also helped convince more missionaries to come to the Americas to study the indigenous people, such as Bernardino de Sahagún, who learned the Native languages to discover more about their cultures and civilizations.

The impact of De Las Casas's doctrine was also limited. In 1550, the king had ordered that the conquest should cease, because the Valladolid debate was to decide whether the war was just or not. The government's orders were hardly respected; conquistadors such as Pedro de Valdivia went on to wage war in Chile during the first half of the 1550s. Expanding the Spanish territory in the New World was allowed again in May 1556, and a decade later, Spain started its conquest of the Philippines.

=== Later years and death ===
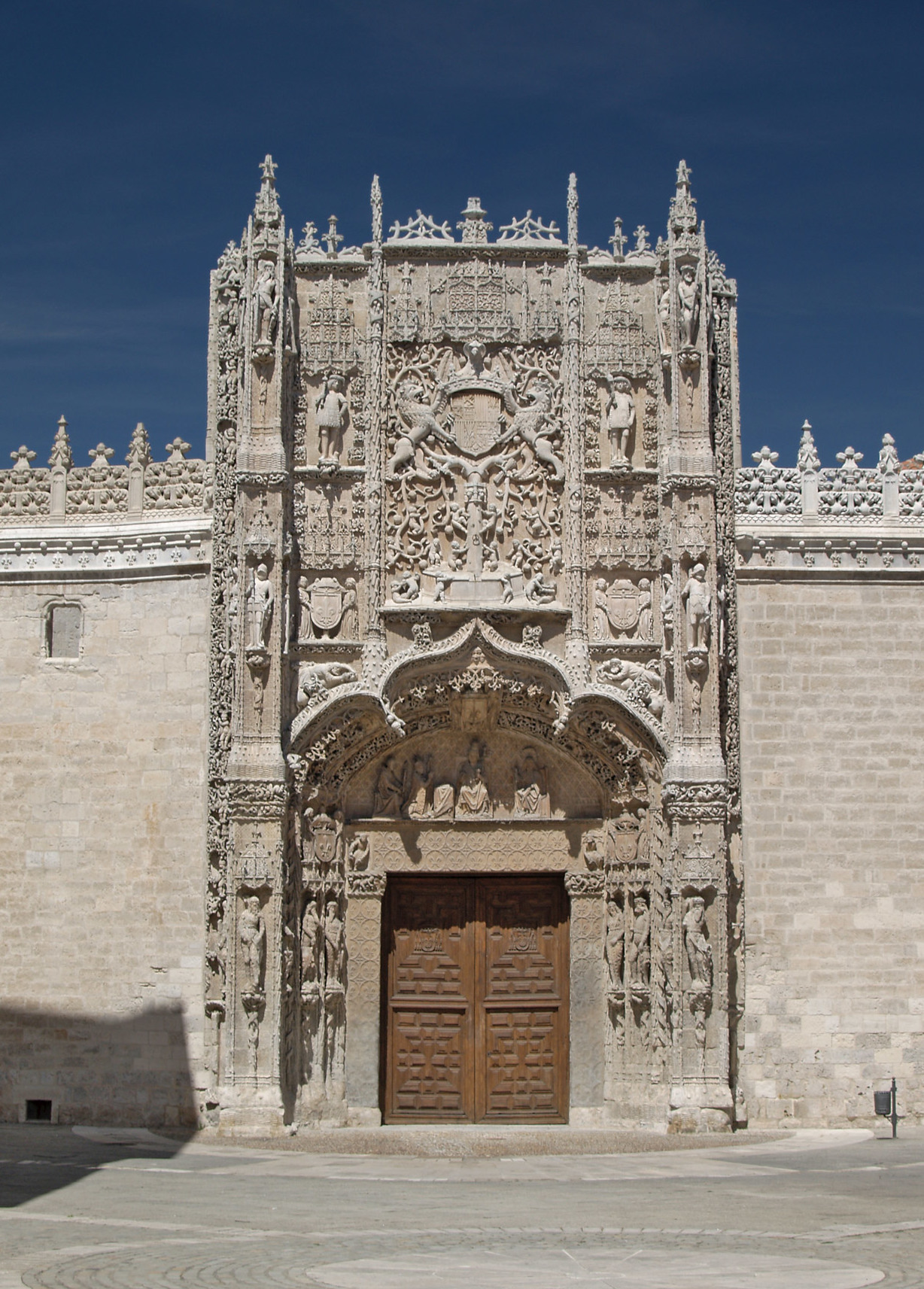
The façade of the Colegio de San Gregorio in Valladolid, where Las Casas spent his final decades

Having resigned the Bishopric of Chiapas, De Las Casas spent the rest of his life working closely with the imperial court in matters relating to the Indies. In 1551 he rented a cell at the College of San Gregorio, where he lived with his assistant and friend Fray Rodrigo de Ladrada. He continued working as a kind of procurator for the Natives of the Indies, many of whom directed petitions to him to speak to the emperor on their behalf. Sometimes indigenous nobility even related their cases to him in Spain, for example, the Nahua noble Francisco Tenamaztle from Nochistlán. His influence at court was so great that some even considered that he had the final word in choosing the members of the Council of the Indies.

In 1552, De Las Casas published A Short Account of the Destruction of the Indies. This book, written a decade earlier and sent to the attention of then-prince Philip II of Spain, contained accounts of the abuses committed by some Spaniards against Native Americans during the early stages of colonization. In 1555 his old Franciscan adversary Toribio de Benavente Motolinia wrote a letter in which he described De Las Casas as an ignorant, arrogant troublemaker. Benavente described indignantly how De Las Casas had once denied baptism to an aging Indian who had walked many leagues to receive it, only on the grounds that he did not believe that the man had received sufficient doctrinal instruction. This letter, which reinvoked the old conflict over the requirements for the sacrament of baptism between the two orders, was intended to bring De Las Casas in disfavour. However, it did not succeed.

One matter in which he invested much effort was the political situation of the Viceroyalty of Peru. In Peru, power struggles between conquistadors and the viceroy became an open civil war in which the conquistadors led by Gonzalo Pizarro rebelled against the New Laws and defeated and executed the viceroy Blasco Núñez Vela in 1546. The emperor sent Pedro de la Gasca, a friend of De Las Casas, to reinstate the rule of law, and he in turn defeated Pizarro. To restabilize the political situation the encomenderos started pushing not only for the repeal of the New Laws, but for turning the encomiendas into perpetual patrimony of the encomenderos – the worst possible outcome from De Las Casas's point of view. The encomenderos offered to buy the rights to the encomiendas from the Crown, and Charles V was inclined to accept since his wars had left him in deep economic troubles. Las Casas worked hard to convince the emperor that it would be a bad economic decision, that it would return the viceroyalty to the brink of open rebellion, and could result in the Crown losing the colony entirely. The emperor, probably because of the doubts caused De by Las Casas's arguments, never took a final decision on the issue of the encomiendas.

In 1561, he finished his Historia de las Indias and signed it over to the College of San Gregorio, stipulating that it could not be published until after forty years. In fact it was not published for 314 years, until 1875. He also had to repeatedly defend himself against accusations of treason: someone, possibly Sepúlveda, denounced him to the Spanish Inquisition, but nothing came from the case. De Las Casas also appeared as a witness in the case of the Inquisition for his friend Archbishop Bartolomé Carranza de Miranda, who had been falsely accused of heresy. In 1565, he wrote his last will, signing over his immense library to the college. Bartolomé de Las Casas died on 18 July 1566, in Madrid.

== Works ==
=== Memorial de Remedios para las Indias ===
The text, written 1516, starts by describing its purpose: to present "The remedies that seem necessary in order that the evil and harm that exists in the Indies cease, and that God and our Lord the Prince may draw greater benefits than hitherto, and that the republic may be better preserved and consoled."

De Las Casas's first proposed remedy was a complete moratorium on the use of Indian labor in the Indies until such time as better regulations of it were set in place. This was meant simply to halt the decimation of the Indian population and to give the surviving Indians time to reconstitute themselves. De Las Casas feared that at the rate the exploitation was proceeding it would be too late to hinder their annihilation unless action were taken rapidly. The second was a change in the labor policy so that instead of a colonist owning the labor of specific Indians, he would have a right to man-hours, to be carried out by no specific persons. This required the establishment of self-governing Indian communities on the land of colonists – who would themselves organize to provide the labor for their patron. The colonist would only have rights to a certain portion of the total labor, so that a part of the Indians were always resting and taking care of the sick. He proposed 12 other remedies, all having the specific aim of improving the situation for the Indians and limiting the powers that colonists were able to exercise over them.

The second part of the Memorial described suggestions for the social and political organization of Indian communities relative to colonial ones. De Las Casas advocated the dismantlement of the city of Asunción and the subsequent gathering of Indians into communities of about 1,000 Indians to be situated as satellites of Spanish towns or mining areas. Here, De Las Casas argued, Indians could be better governed, better taught and indoctrinated in the Christian faith, and would be easier to protect from abuse than if they were in scattered settlements. Each town would have a royal hospital built with four wings in the shape of a cross, where up to 200 sick Indians could be cared for at a time. He described in detail social arrangements, distribution of work, how provisions would be divided and even how table manners were to be introduced. Regarding expenses, he argued that "this should not seem expensive or difficult, because after all, everything comes from them [the Indians] and they work for it and it is theirs." He even drew up a budget of each pueblo's expenses to cover wages for administrators, clerics, Bachelors of Latin, doctors, surgeons, pharmacists, advocates, ranchers, miners, muleteers, hospitalers, pig herders, fishermen, etc.

=== A Short Account of the Destruction of the Indies ===
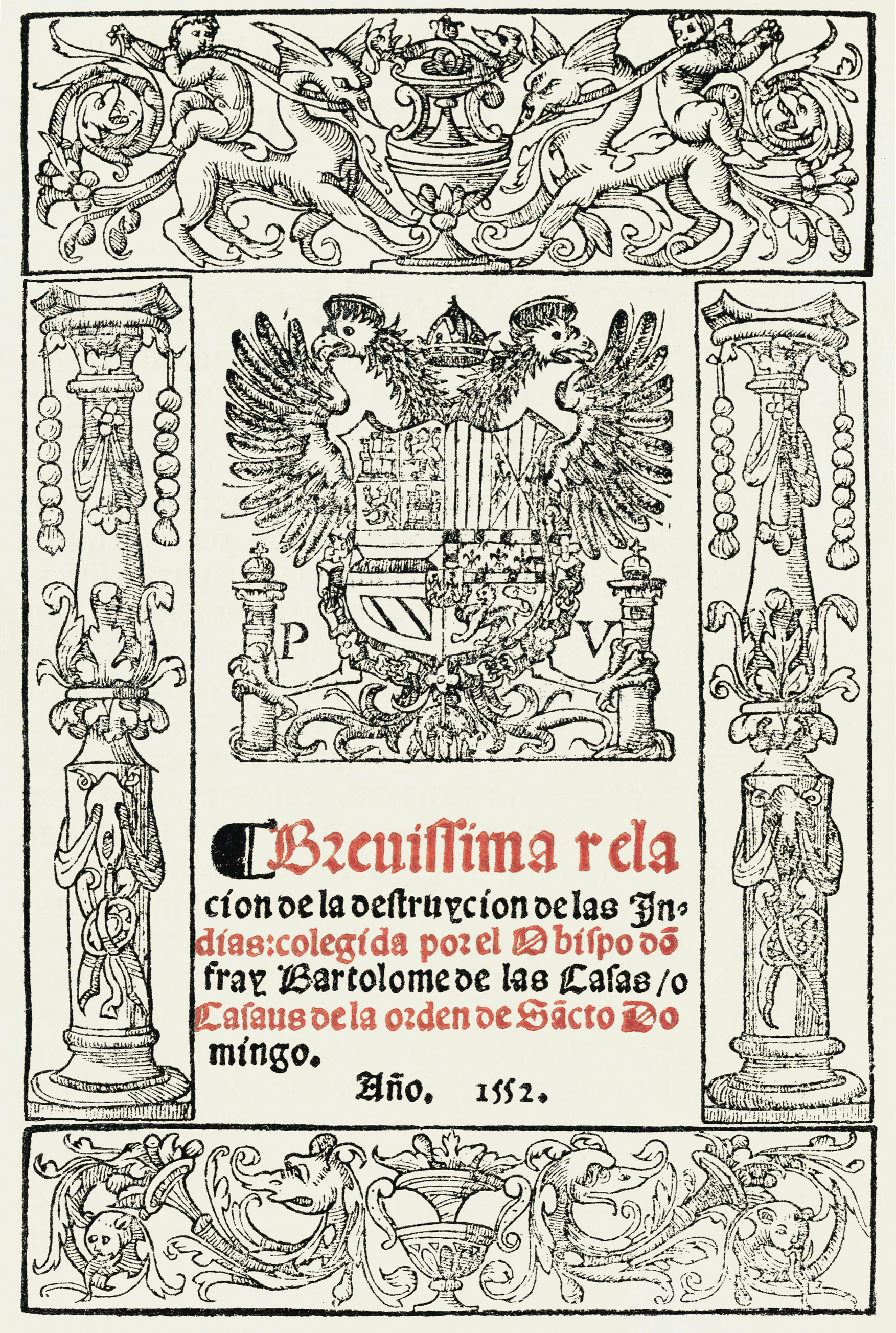
Cover of the Brevísima relación de la destrucción de las Indias (1552), Bartolomé de las Casas

A Short Account of the Destruction of the Indies (Note: Also translated and published in English as A Brief Account of the Destruction of the Indies, among several other variants.) (Spanish: Brevísima relación de la destrucción de las Indias) is an account written in 1542 (published in Seville in 1552) about the mistreatment of the indigenous peoples of the Americas in colonial times and sent to then-Prince Philip II of Spain. One of the stated purposes for writing the account was De Las Casas's fear of Spain coming under divine punishment and his concern for the souls of the native peoples. The account was one of the first attempts by a Spanish writer of the colonial era to depict the unfair treatment that the indigenous people endured during the early stages of the Spanish conquest of the Greater Antilles, particularly the island of Hispaniola. De Las Casas's point of view can be described as being heavily against some of the Spanish methods of colonization, which, as he described them, inflicted great losses on the indigenous occupants of the islands. In addition, his critique towards the colonizers served to bring awareness to his audience on the true meaning of Christianity, to dismantle any misconceptions on evangelization. His account was largely responsible for the adoption of the New Laws of 1542, which abolished native slavery for the first time in European colonial history and led to the Valladolid debate.

The book became an important element in the creation and propagation of the so-called Black Legend – the tradition of describing the Spanish empire as exceptionally morally corrupt and violent. It was republished several times by groups that were critical of the Spanish realm for political or religious reasons. The first edition in translation was published in Dutch in 1578, during the religious persecution of Dutch Protestants by the Spanish crown, followed by editions in French (1578), English (1583), and German (1599) – all countries where religious wars were raging. The first edition published in Spain after De Las Casas's death appeared in Barcelona during the Catalan Revolt of 1646. The book was banned by the Aragonese inquisition in 1659.

The images described by De Las Casas were later depicted by Theodore de Bry in copper plate engravings that served as a medium of the Black Legend against Spain.

=== Apologetic History of the Indies ===
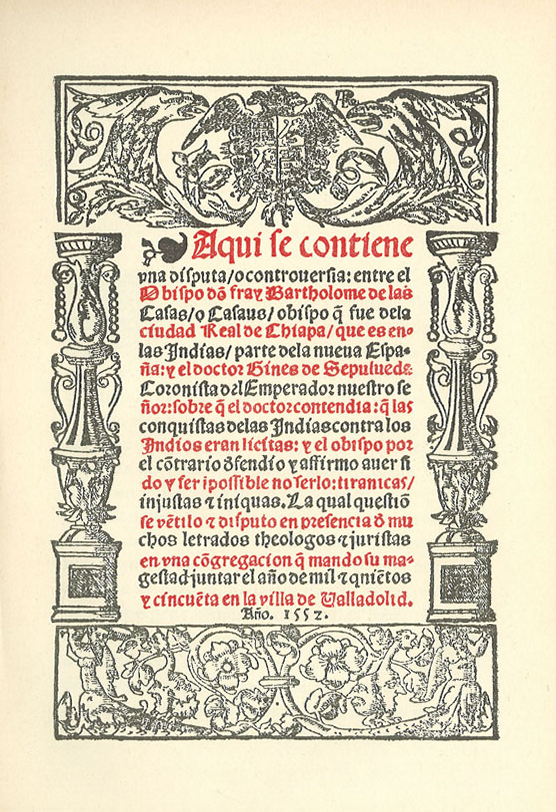
Cover of the Disputa o controversia con Ginés de Sepúlveda (1552), Bartolomé de las Casas

The Apologetic Summary History of the People of These Indies (Spanish: Apologética historia summaria de las gentes destas Indias) was first written as the 68th chapter of the General History of the Indies, but De Las Casas changed it into a volume of its own, recognizing that the material was not historical. The material contained in the Apologetic History is primarily ethnographic accounts of the Indigenous cultures of the Indies – the Lucayans, the Ciboney, the Taíno, and the Guanahatabey, but it also contains descriptions of many of the other Indigenous cultures that Las Casas learned about through his travels and readings. The history is apologetic because it is written as a defense of the cultural level of the Indians, arguing throughout that Indigenous peoples of the Americas were just as civilized as the Roman, Greek and Egyptian civilizations – and more civilized than some European civilizations. It was in essence a comparative ethnography comparing practices and customs of European and American cultures and evaluating them according to whether they were good or bad, seen from a Christian viewpoint.

He wrote: "I have declared and demonstrated openly and concluded, from chapter 22 to the end of this whole book, that all people of these our Indies are human, so far as is possible by the natural and human way and without the light of faith – had their republics, places, towns, and cities most abundant and well provided for, and did not lack anything to live politically and socially, and attain and enjoy civil happiness.... And they equaled many nations of this world that are renowned and considered civilized, and they surpassed many others, and to none were they inferior. Among those they equaled were the Greeks and the Romans, and they surpassed them by many good and better customs. They surpassed also the English and the French and some of the people of our own Spain; and they were incomparably superior to countless others, in having good customs and lacking many evil ones." This work in which De Las Casas combined his own ethnographic observations with those of other writers, and compared customs and cultures between different peoples, has been characterized as an early beginning of the discipline of anthropology.

=== History of the Indies ===
The History of the Indies is a three-volume work begun in 1527 while De Las Casas was in the Convent of Puerto de Plata. It found its final form in 1561, when he was working in the Colegio de San Gregorio. Originally planned as a six-volume work, each volume describes a decade of the history of the Indies from the creation of the world to 1520, and most of it is an eye-witness account. It was in the History of the Indies that De Las Casas finally regretted his advocacy for African slavery, and included a sincere apology, writing: "I soon repented and judged myself guilty of ignorance. I came to realize that black slavery was as unjust as Indian slavery... and I was not sure that my ignorance and good faith would secure me in the eyes of God." (Vol II, p. 257)

History of the Indies has never been fully translated into English. The only translations into English are the 1971 partial translation by Andrée M. Collard, and partial translations by Cynthia L. Chamberlin, Nigel Griffin, Michael Hammer and Blair Sullivan in UCLA's Repertorium Columbianum (Volumes VI, VII and XI).

=== Archiving Christopher Columbus's Journal ===
De Las Casas copied Columbus's diary from his 1492 voyage to modern-day Bahamas. His copy is notable because Columbus's diary itself was lost.

== Legacy ==
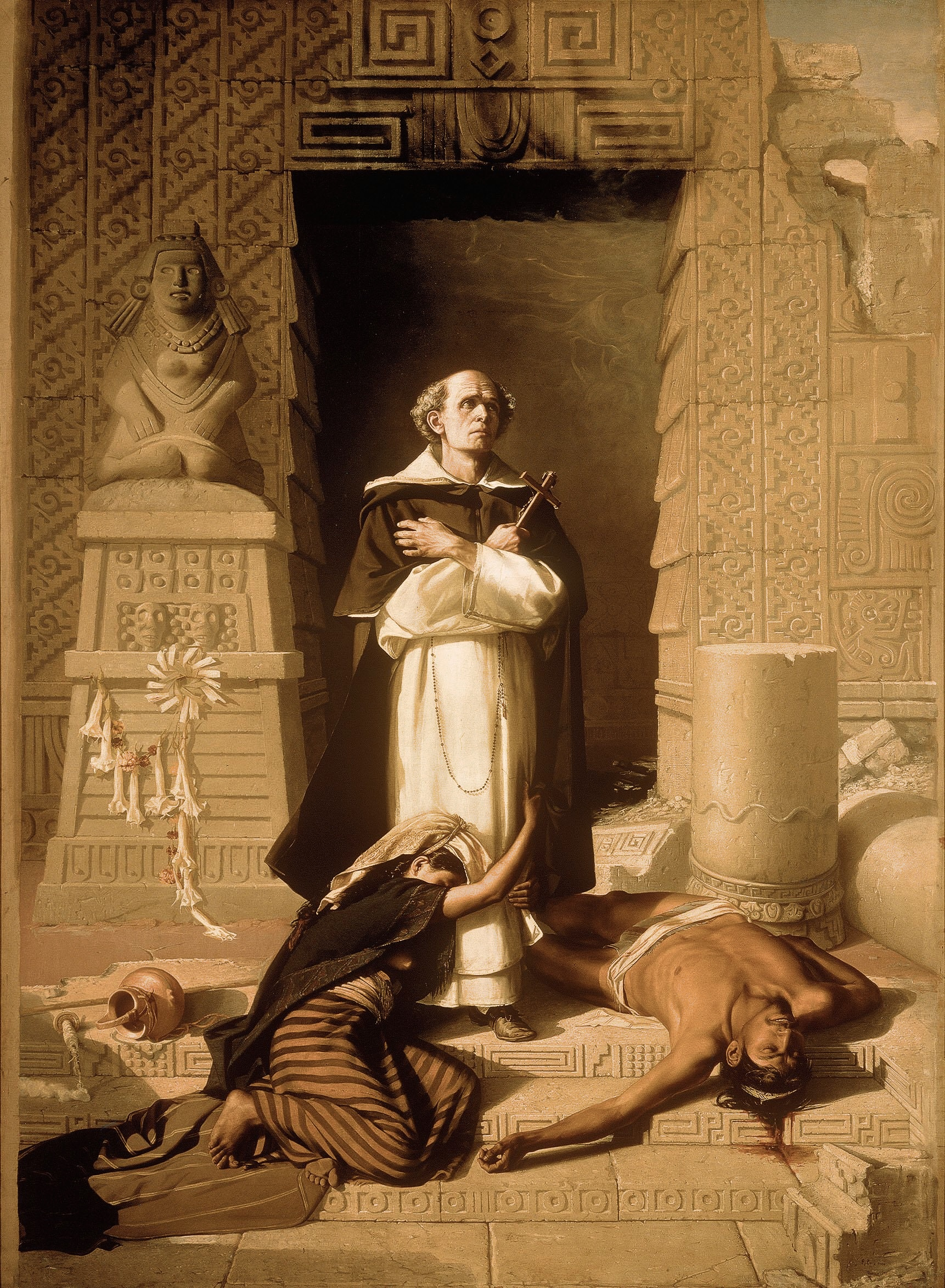
Fray Bartolomé de las Casas depicted as Savior of the Indians in a later painting by Felix Parra

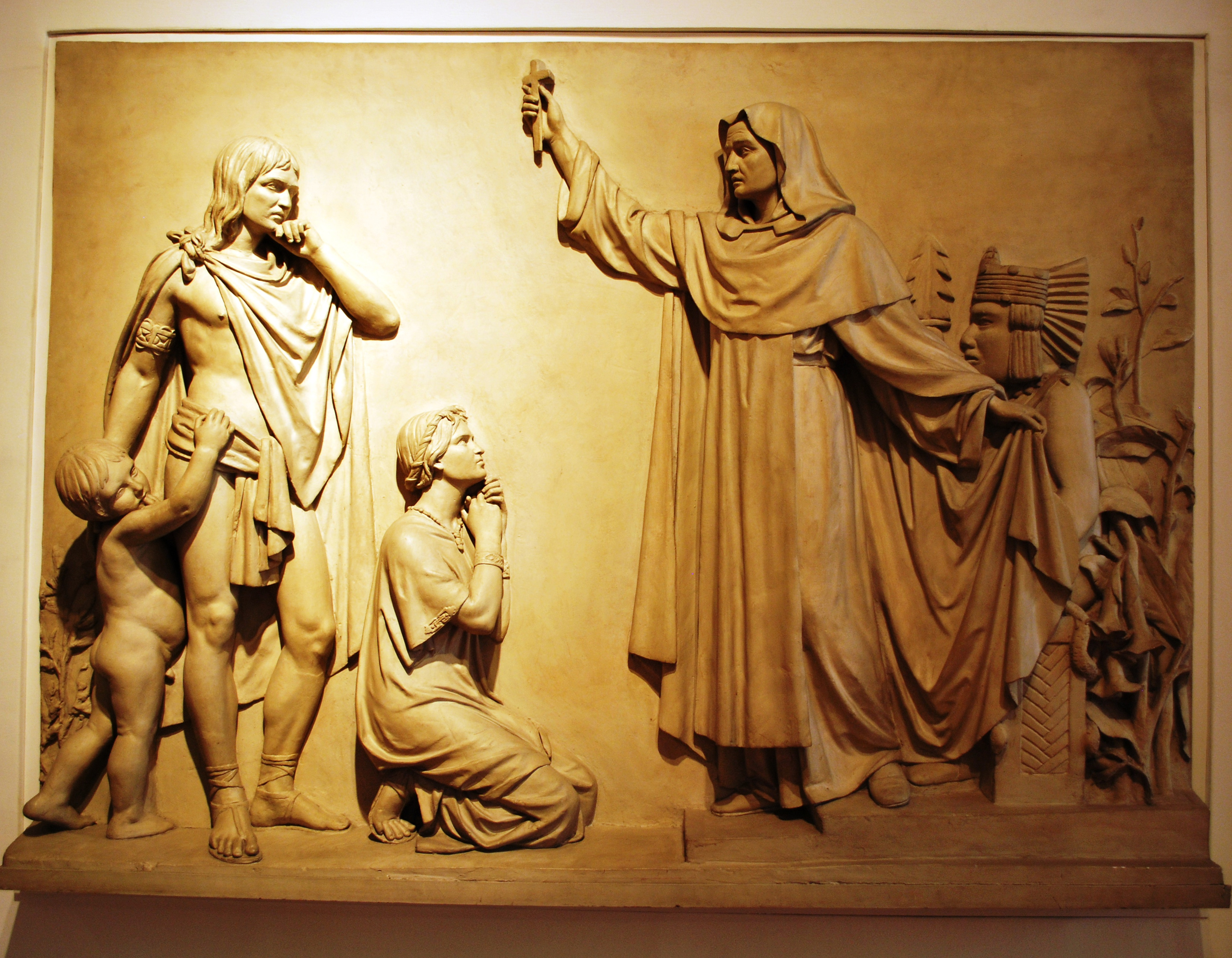
Fray Bartolomé de las Casas, convertiendo a una familia azteca, by Miguel Noreña

De Las Casas's legacy has been highly controversial. In the years following his death, his ideas became taboo in the Spanish realm, and he was seen as a nearly heretical extremist. The accounts written by his enemies Lopez de Gómara and Oviedo were widely read and published in Europe. As the influence of the Spanish Empire was displaced by that of other European powers, De Las Casas's accounts were utilized as political tools to justify incursions into Spanish colonies. This historiographic phenomenon has been referred to by some historians as the "Black Legend", a tendency by mostly Protestant authors to portray Spanish Catholicism and colonialism in the worst possible light.

Opposition to De Las Casas reached its climax in historiography with Spanish right-wing, nationalist historians in the late 19th and early 20th centuries constructing a pro-Spanish White Legend, arguing that the Spanish Empire was benevolent and just and denying any adverse consequences of Spanish colonialism. Spanish pro-imperial historians such as Menéndez y Pelayo, Menéndez Pidal, and J. Pérez de Barrada depicted De Las Casas as a madman, describing him as a "paranoic" and a monomaniac given to exaggeration, and as a traitor towards his own nation. Menéndez Pelayo also accused De Las Casas of having been instrumental in suppressing the publication of Juan Ginés de Sepúlveda's "Democrates Alter" (also called Democrates Secundus) out of spite, but other historians find that to be unlikely since it was rejected by the theologians of both Alcalá and Salamanca, who were unlikely to be influenced by De Las Casas.

=== Criticisms ===
De Las Casas has also often been accused of exaggerating the atrocities he described in the Indies, some scholars holding that the initial population figures given by him were too high, which would make the population decline look worse than it actually was, and that epidemics of European disease were the prime cause of the population decline, not violence and exploitation. Demographic studies such as those of colonial Mexico by Sherburne F. Cook in the mid-20th century suggested that the decline in the first years of the conquest was indeed drastic, ranging between 80 and 90%, due to many different causes but all ultimately traceable to the arrival of the Europeans. The overwhelming cause was the disease introduced by the Europeans. Historians have also noted that exaggeration and inflation of numbers were the norm in writing in 16th-century accounts, and both contemporary detractors and supporters of De Las Casas were guilty of similar exaggerations.

The Dominican friars Antonio de Montesinos and Pedro de Córdoba had reported extensive violence already in the first decade of the colonization of the Americas, and throughout the conquest of the Americas, there were reports of abuse of the natives from friars, priests, and ordinary citizens, and many massacres of indigenous people were reported in full by those who perpetrated them. Even some of De Las Casas's enemies, such as Toribio de Benavente Motolinia, reported many gruesome atrocities committed against the Indians by the colonizers. All in all, modern historians tend to disregard the numerical figures given by De Las Casas, but they maintain that his general picture of a violent and abusive conquest represented reality.

One persistent point of criticism has been De Las Casas's repeated suggestions of replacing Indian with African slave labor. Even though he regretted that position later in his life and included an apology in his History of the Indies, some later criticism held him responsible for the institution of the transatlantic slave trade. One detractor, the abolitionist David Walker, called De Las Casas a "wretch... stimulated by sordid avarice only," holding him responsible for the enslavement of thousands of Africans. Other historians, such as John Fiske writing in 1900, denied that De Las Casas's suggestions affected the development of the slave trade. Benjamin Keen likewise did not consider De Las Casas to have had any substantial impact on the slave trade, which was well in place before he began writing. That view is contradicted by Sylvia Wynter, who argued that De Las Casas's 1516 Memorial was the direct cause of Charles V granting permission in 1518 to transport the first 4,000 African slaves to Jamaica.

A growing corpus of scholarship has sought to deconstruct and reassess the role of De Las Casas in Spanish colonialism. Daniel Castro, in his Another Face of Empire (2007), takes on such a task. He argues that he was more of a politician than a humanitarian and that his liberation policies were always combined with schemes to make colonial extraction of resources from the natives more efficient. He also argues that De Las Casas failed to realize that by seeking to replace indigenous spirituality with Christianity, he was undertaking a religious colonialism that was more intrusive than the physical one. The responses to his work are varied. Some claim that Castro's portrayal of De Las Casas had an air of anachronism. Others have agreed with Castro's deconstruction of De Las Casas as a nuanced and contradictory historical figure.

=== Cultural legacy ===
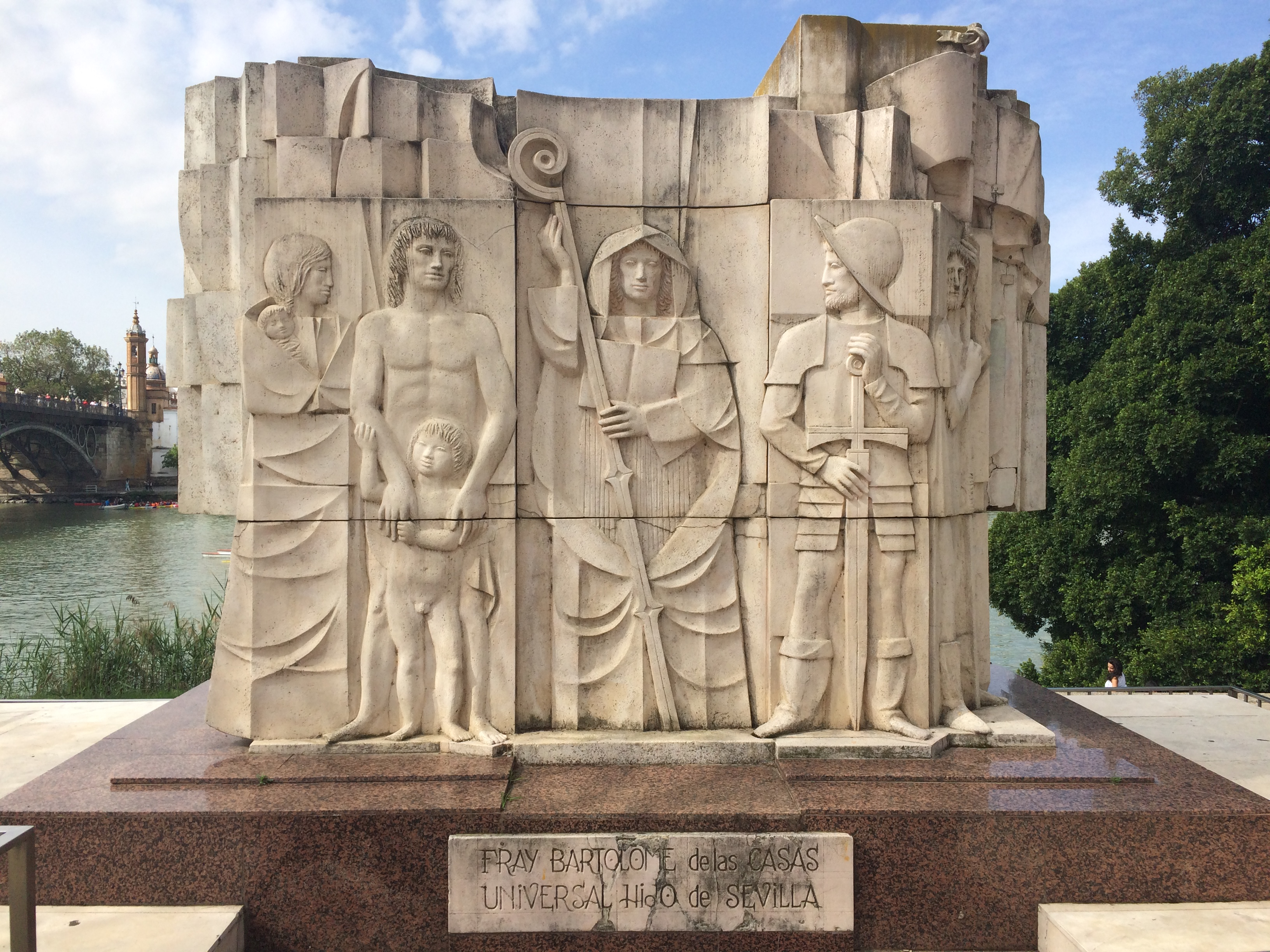
Monument to Bartolomé de las Casas in Seville, Spain.

In 1848, Ciudad de San Cristóbal, then the capital of the Mexican state of Chiapas, was renamed San Cristóbal de Las Casas in honor of its first bishop. His work is a particular inspiration behind the work of the De Las Casas Institute at Blackfriars Hall, Oxford. He is also often cited as a predecessor of the liberation theology movement. Bartolomé is remembered in the Church of England with a commemoration on 20 July, in the Episcopal Church on 18 July, and at the Evangelical Lutheran Church on 17 July. In the Catholic Church, the Dominicans introduced his cause for beatification in 1976. In 2002 the church began the process for his beatification.

He was among the first to develop a view of unity among humankind in the New World, stating that "All people of the world are humans," and that they had a natural right to liberty – a combination of Thomist rights philosophy with Augustinian political theology. In this capacity, an ecumenical human rights institute located in San Cristóbal de las Casas, the Centro Fray Bartolomé de las Casas de Derechos Humanos, was established by Bishop Samuel Ruiz in 1989.

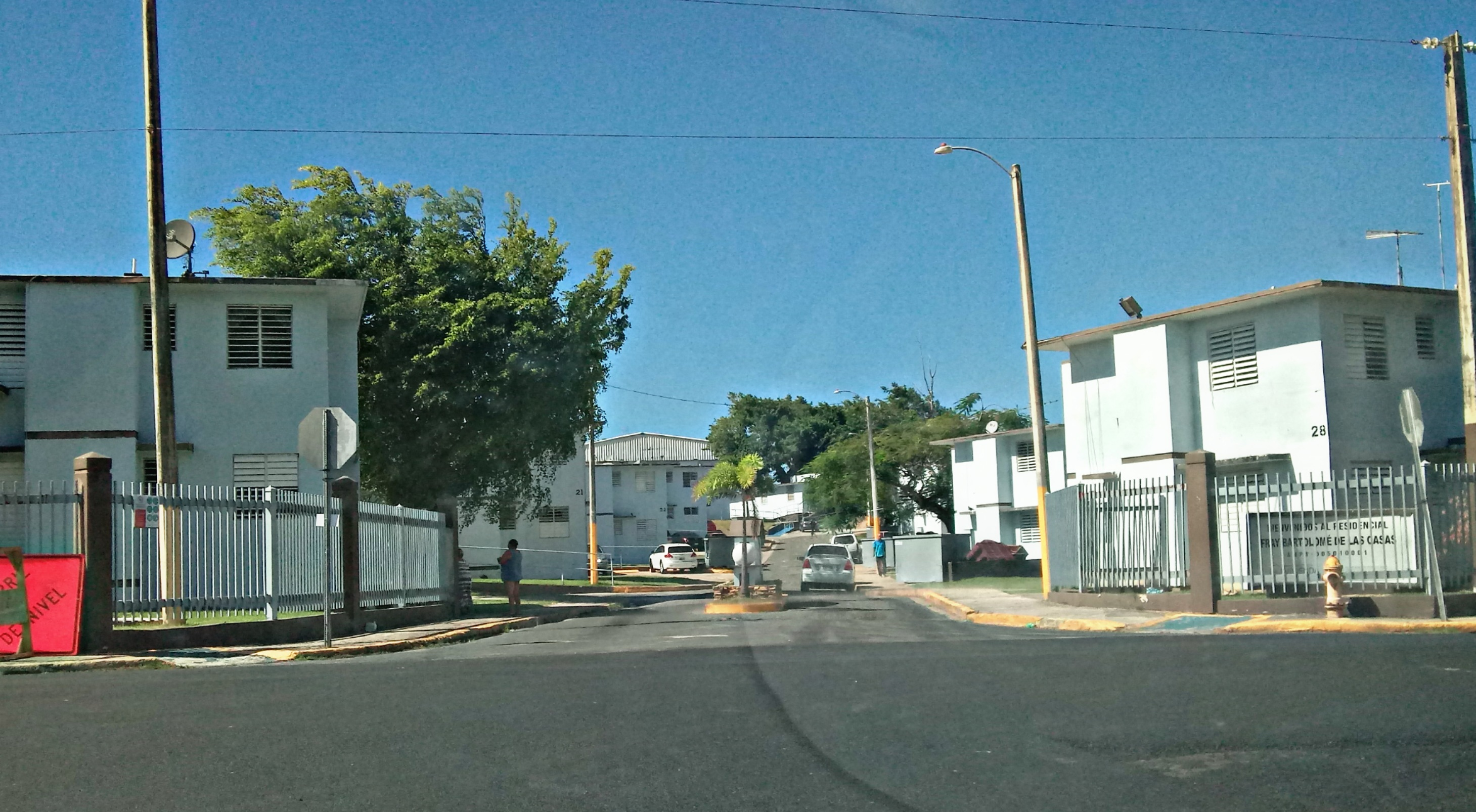
Residencial Las Casas in Santurce, San Juan

Residencial Las Casas in Santurce, San Juan, Puerto Rico is named after De Las Casas.

He is also featured on the Guatemalan quetzal one centavo coin (Q0.01).

The small town of Lascassas, Tennessee, in the United States has also been named after him.

== See also ==
- Fountain to Bartolomé de las Casas

== Notes ==
=== Citations ===
Catholic Church titles
Preceded by Juan de Arteaga y Avendaño	Bishop of Chiapas; 19 Dec 1543 – 11 Sep 1550 Resigned	Succeeded by Tomás Casillas, O.P.
