= Juan de Arteaga y Avendaño =

Most Reverend Juan de Arteaga y Avendaño
- Bishop-Elect of Chiapas
- Church: Catholic Church
- Diocese: Diocese of Chiapas
- In office: 1540
- Predecessor: Juan de Urteaga
- Successor: Bartolomé de las Casas

Personal details
- Born: Estepa, Spain
- Died: 8 September 1540

Juan de Arteaga y Avendaño (died 1540) was a Roman Catholic prelate who was appointed the second Bishop of Chiapas (1540).

== Biography ==
Juan de Arteaga y Avendaño was born in Estepa, Spain. On 16 Jul 1540, he was appointed during the papacy of Pope Paul III as Bishop of Chiapas. He died before he was consecrated bishop on 8 Sep 1540.

== External links and additional sources ==
- Cheney, David M. "Diocese of San Cristóbal de Las Casas". Catholic-Hierarchy.org. (for Chronology of Bishops) ^{[self-published]}
- Chow, Gabriel. "Diocese of San Cristóbal de Las Casas". GCatholic.org. (for Chronology of Bishops) ^{[self-published]}

Catholic Church titles
Preceded by Juan de Urteaga	Bishop-Elect of Chiapas; 1540	Succeeded by Bartolomé de las Casas
