= Fountain to Bartolomé de las Casas =

Fountain and sculpture in Mexico City, Mexico

- Fuente de Fray Bartolomé de las Casas (Spanish)
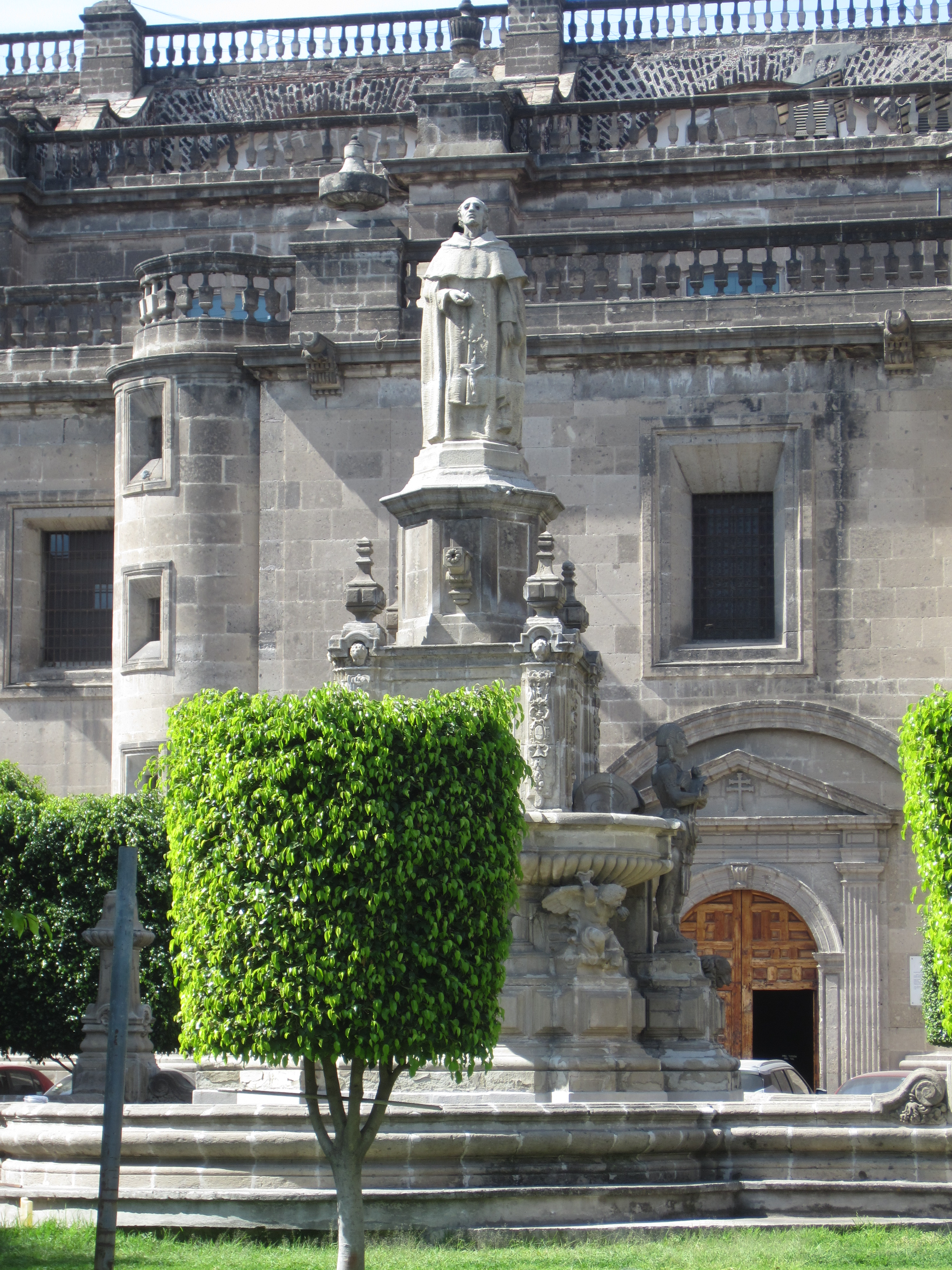
- The fountain in 2018
- Location in Mexico City
- Artist: José Fernández Urbina
- Year: 1924
- Location: Mexico City, Mexico; 19°26′4.6″N 99°7′57″W

The Fountain to Bartolomé de las Casas (Spanish: Fuente de Fray Bartolomé de las Casas) is installed since 1924 outside the Mexico City Metropolitan Cathedral, in Mexico. The statue of de las Casas was designed by José Fernández Urbina.
