= Juan de Ortega (bishop of Chiapas) =

Catholic bishop (died 1557)

Most Reverend Juan de Ortega
- Bishop-Elect of Chiapas
- Church: Catholic Church
- Diocese: Diocese of Chiapas
- In office: 1539–1540
- Successor: Juan de Arteaga y Avendaño

Personal details
- Died: 1557

Juan de Ortega, O.S.H. (c. 1495 – August 1557) was a Roman Catholic prelate who was appointed the first Bishop of Chiapas (1539–1540).

Juan de Ortega was ordained a priest in the Order of Saint Jerome. On 30 Mar 1539, he was appointed during the papacy of Pope Paul III as Bishop of Chiapas.

He has been proposed as the author of Lazarillo de Tormes.

== External links and additional sources ==
- Cheney, David M. "Diocese of San Cristóbal de Las Casas". Catholic-Hierarchy.org. (for Chronology of Bishops) ^{[self-published]}
- Chow, Gabriel. "Diocese of San Cristóbal de Las Casas". GCatholic.org. (for Chronology of Bishops) ^{[self-published]}

Catholic Church titles
| Preceded by None | Bishop-Elect of Chiapas; 1539–1540 | Succeeded by Juan de Arteaga y Avendaño |
