= Christopher Columbus =

Italian navigator and explorer (1451–1506)

Admiral of the Ocean Sea Christopher Columbus
- Painting said to be a posthumous portrait of Christopher Columbus, by Sebastiano del Piombo, 1519 (Note: There are no known authentic portraits of Columbus.)

1st Governor of the Indies
- In office 1492–1499
- Appointed by: Isabella I of Castile
- Preceded by: Office established
- Succeeded by: Francisco de Bobadilla

Personal details
- Born: Between 25 August and 31 October 1451 Genoa, Republic of Genoa (Present day Italy)
- Died: 20 May 1506 (aged 54) Valladolid, Spain
- Resting place: Seville Cathedral, Seville, Spain
- Spouse: Filipa Moniz Perestrelo (m. 1479; died 1484)
- Domestic partner: Beatriz Enríquez de Arana
- Children: Diego; Ferdinand; Diego (adopted Lucayan)
- Parents: Domenico Colombo (father); Susanna Fontanarossa (mother)
- Relatives: Bartholomew Columbus (brother)
- Occupation: Explorer; navigator

Christopher Columbus (Note: In other relevant languages: Spanish: Cristóbal Colón [kɾisˈtoβal koˈlon]; Portuguese: Cristóvão Colombo [kɾiʃˈtɔvɐ̃w kuˈlõbu]; Catalan: Cristòfor (or Cristòfol) Colom [kɾisˈtɔfuɾ kuˈlom, -ful k-]; Italian: Cristoforo Colombo [kriˈstɔːforo koˈlombo]; Ligurian: Cristoffa C(or)ombo [kɾiˈʃtɔffa kuˈɾuŋbu, – ˈkuŋbu]; Latin: Christophorus Columbus.) (/kəˈlʌmbəs/; between 25 August and 31 October 1451 – 20 May 1506) was an Italian (Note: Although the modern state of Italy was not established until 1861, the Latin equivalent of the term "Italian" had been in use for natives of the region since antiquity; most scholars believe that Columbus was born in Genoa, in what is now Italy.) explorer and navigator from the Republic of Genoa who completed four transatlantic voyages in the name of the Spanish Catholic Monarchs, opening the way for the widespread European exploration and colonization of the Americas. His expeditions were the first known European contact with the Caribbean and Central and South America.

Growing up on the coast of Liguria, he went to sea at a young age and traveled widely, as far north as the British Isles and as far south as what is now Ghana. He married a Portuguese noblewoman Filipa Moniz Perestrelo, who bore their son, Diego, and was based in Lisbon, for several years. He later took a Castilian mistress, Beatriz Enríquez de Arana, who bore their son, Ferdinand.

Largely self-educated, Columbus was knowledgeable in geography, astronomy, and history. He developed a plan to seek a western sea passage to the East Indies, hoping to profit from the lucrative spice trade. After the Granada War, and Columbus's persistent lobbying in multiple kingdoms, the Catholic Monarchs of Spain, Queen Isabella I and King Ferdinand II, agreed to sponsor a journey west. Columbus left the Port of Palos in August 1492 with three ships and made landfall in the Americas on 12 October, ending the period of human habitation in the Americas now referred to as the pre-Columbian era. His landing place was an island in the Bahamas, known then by its inhabitants as Guanahani. He then visited the islands now known as Cuba and Hispaniola, establishing the short-lived fort of La Navidad in what is now Haiti. Columbus returned to Castile in early 1493 with captured natives, and word of his first voyage quickly spread throughout Europe.

Columbus made three further voyages to the Americas, exploring the Lesser Antilles in 1493, Trinidad and the northern coast of South America in 1498, and the east coast of Central America in 1502. Many of the names given to geographical features by Columbus, particularly the names of islands, are still in use. He mistakenly gave the name indios (Spanish for "Indians") to the inhabitants, believing he made it to the East Indies. The extent to which he was aware that the Americas were a wholly separate landmass is uncertain; he never clearly renounced his belief that he had reached the Far East. As a colonial governor, Columbus was accused by some of his contemporaries of significant brutality and removed from the post. Columbus's strained relationship with the Crown of Castile and its colonial administrators in the Americas led to his arrest and removal from Hispaniola in 1500, and later to protracted litigation during the pleitos colombinos ("Columbian lawsuits") over the privileges he and his heirs claimed were owed to them by the Crown.

Columbus's expeditions inaugurated a period of exploration, conquest, and colonization that lasted for centuries, thus bringing the Americas into the European sphere of influence. The transfer of plants, animals, precious metals, culture, human populations, technology, diseases, and ideas between the Old World and New World that followed his first voyage are known as the Columbian exchange, named after him. These events and the effects which persist to the present are often cited as the beginning of the modern era. Diseases and warfare introduced from the Old World had contributed to the decline or genocide of Hispaniola's indigenous peoples, who were also subject to enslavement and other mistreatment by Columbus's government. Growing public awareness of these actions by Columbus has led to increased scrutiny of him in Western culture, which had historically idealized him as a heroic discoverer of new lands; nonetheless, numerous places are named and memorials are dedicated in honor of him.

== Early life ==
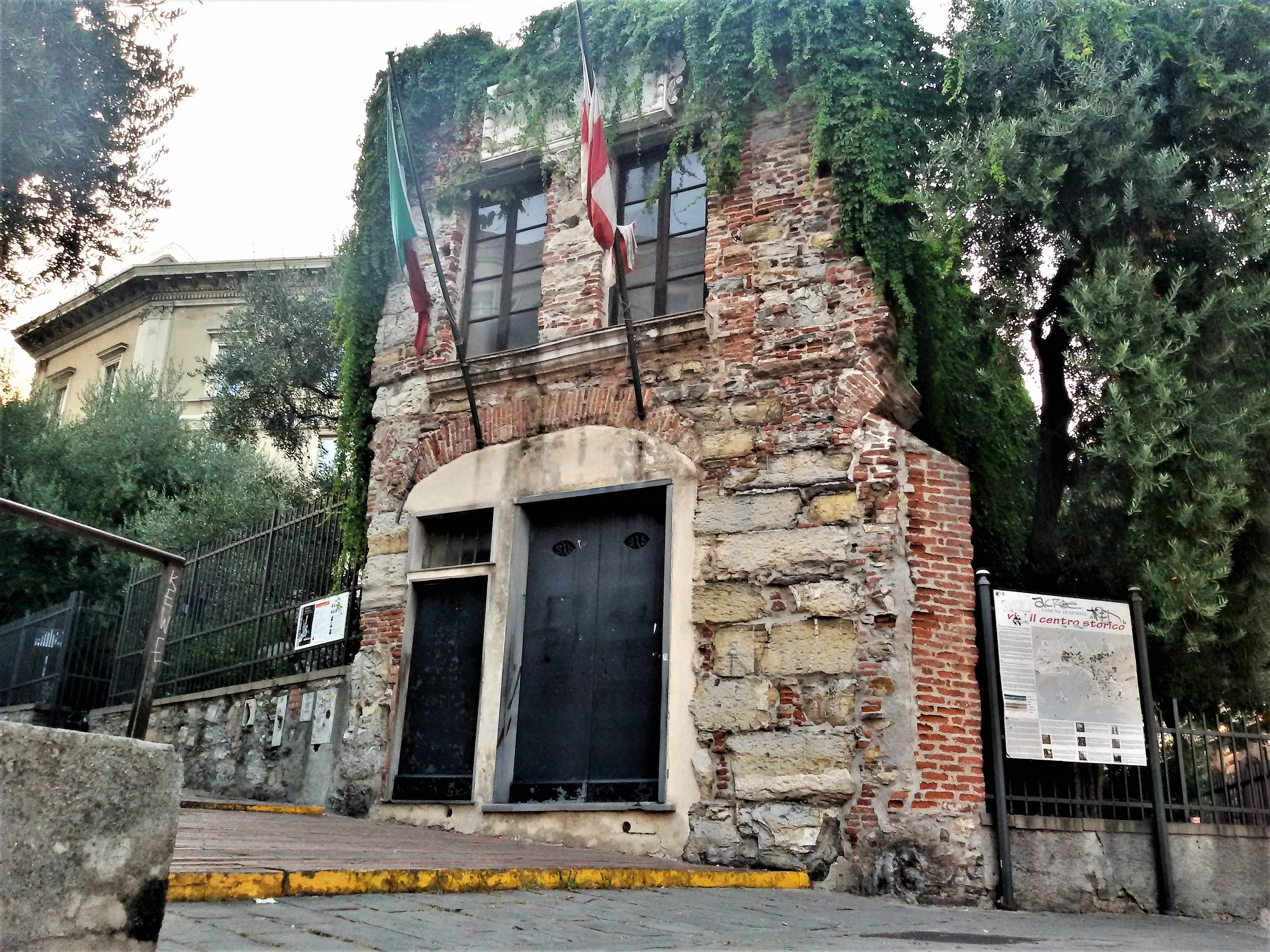
Christopher Columbus House in Genoa, Italy, an 18th-century reconstruction of the house in which Columbus grew up. The original was likely destroyed by the French during the 1684 bombardment of Genoa.

Over the centuries, authors and scholars have proposed many theories about Columbus's origins, often to claim his heritage for their own country. However, the scholarly consensus is that Columbus was born in the Republic of Genoa, sometime between 25 August and 31 October 1451. His father was Domenico Colombo, a wool weaver who worked in Genoa and Savona, and owned a cheese stand at which young Christopher worked. His mother was Susanna Fontanarossa. He had three brothers—Bartholomew, Giovanni Pellegrino, and Giacomo (also called Diego)—as well as a sister, Bianchinetta. Bartholomew ran a cartography workshop in Lisbon for at least part of his adulthood.

Columbus is presumed to have spoken a Genoese dialect (Ligurian) as his native language, though he probably never wrote in it. His name in 15th-century Genoese was Cristoffa Corombo; in Italian, Cristoforo Colombo; and in Spanish, Cristóbal Colón. The English name Christopher Columbus is the anglicization of the Latinized form of his name (Christophorus Columbus).

In one of his writings, Columbus says he went to sea at age 14. In 1470, the family moved to Savona, where Domenico took over a tavern. Some modern authors have argued that he was not from Genoa, but from the Aragon region of Spain or from Portugal. These competing hypotheses have been discounted by most scholars.

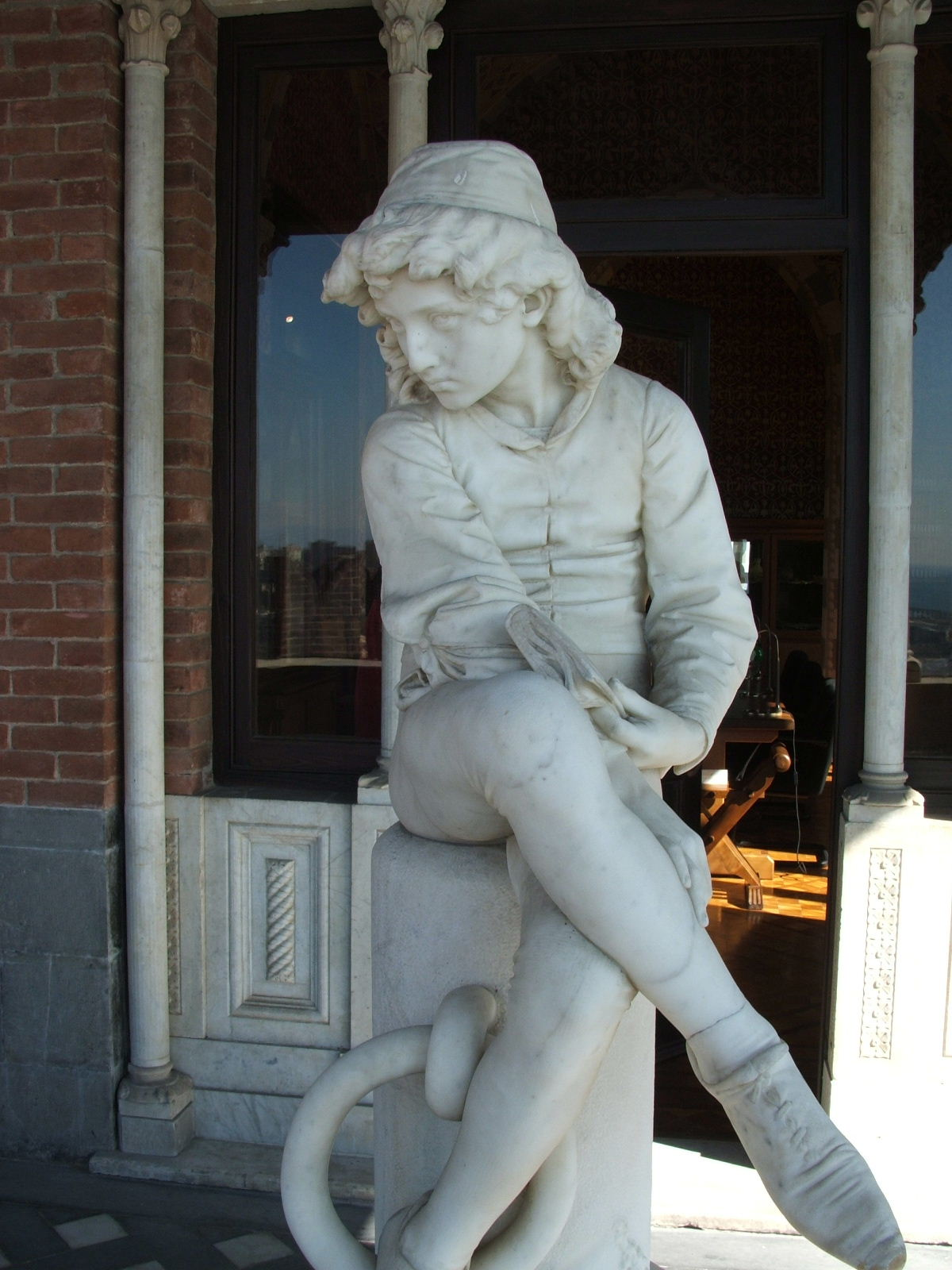
Colombo giovinetto, sculpture of young Columbus by Giulio Monteverde, Genoa

In 1473, Columbus began his apprenticeship as business agent for the wealthy Spinola, Centurione, and Di Negro families of Genoa. Later, he made a trip to Chios in the Aegean Sea, then ruled by Genoa. In May 1476, he took part in an armed convoy sent by Genoa to carry valuable cargo to northern Europe. He probably visited Bristol, England, and Galway, Ireland, where he may have visited St. Nicholas' Collegiate Church. In August 1476, Columbus was shipwrecked on the coast of Lagos, Portugal, after the ship he was on, part of a Genoese trading fleet, was attacked by French and Portuguese vessels. After the shipwreck, Columbus travelled to Lisbon, where he lived for several years. It has been speculated he went to Iceland in 1477, though many scholars doubt this. It is known that in the autumn of 1477, he sailed on a Portuguese ship from Galway to Lisbon, where he found his brother Bartholomew, and they continued trading for the Centurione family. Columbus based himself in Lisbon from 1477 to 1485. In 1478, the Centuriones sent Columbus on a sugar-buying trip to Madeira. He married Felipa Perestrello e Moniz, daughter of Bartolomeu Perestrello, a Portuguese nobleman of Lombard origin, who had been the donatary captain of Porto Santo.

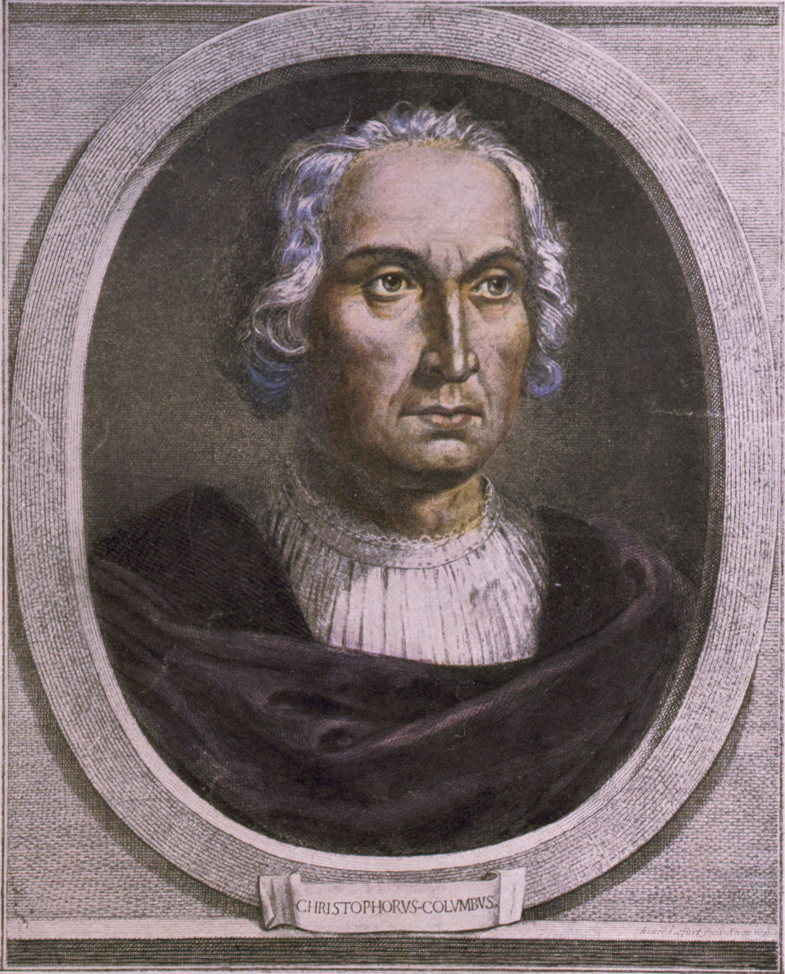
Portrait of Columbus by Aliprando Caprioli

In 1479 or 1480, Columbus's son Diego was born. Between 1482 and 1485, Columbus traded along the coasts of West Africa, reaching the Portuguese trading post of Elmina at the Guinea coast in present-day Ghana. Before 1484, Columbus returned to Porto Santo to find that his wife had died. He returned to Portugal to settle her estate and take Diego with him. He left Portugal for Castile in 1485, where he took a mistress in 1487, a 20-year-old orphan named Beatriz Enríquez de Arana. It is likely that Beatriz met Columbus when he was in Córdoba, a gathering place for Genoese merchants and where the court of the Catholic Monarchs was located at intervals. Beatriz, unmarried at the time, gave birth to Columbus's second son, Fernando Columbus, in July 1488, named for the monarch of Aragon. Columbus recognized the boy as his offspring. Columbus entrusted his older, legitimate son Diego to take care of Beatriz and pay the pension set aside for her following his death, but Diego was negligent in his duties.

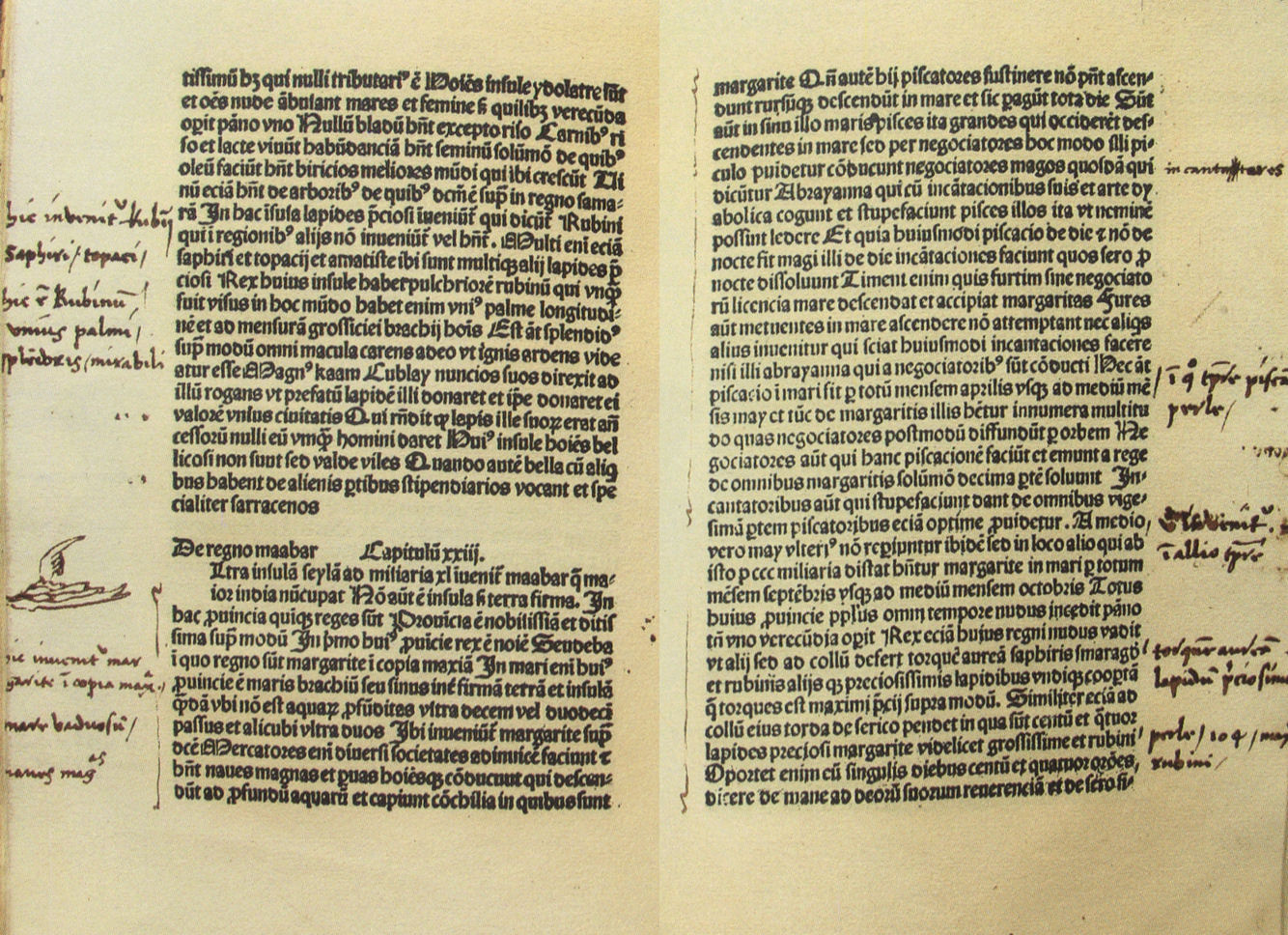
Columbus's copy of The Travels of Marco Polo, with his handwritten notes in Latin in the margins

Columbus learned Latin, Portuguese, and Castilian. He read widely about astronomy, geography, and history, including the works of Ptolemy, Pierre d'Ailly's Imago Mundi, the travels of Marco Polo and Sir John Mandeville, Pliny's Natural History, and Pope Pius II's Historia rerum ubique gestarum. According to historian Edmund Morgan,

Columbus was not a scholarly man. Yet he studied these books, made hundreds of marginal notations in them and came out with ideas about the world that were characteristically simple and strong and sometimes wrong ...

== Quest for Asia ==
=== Background ===
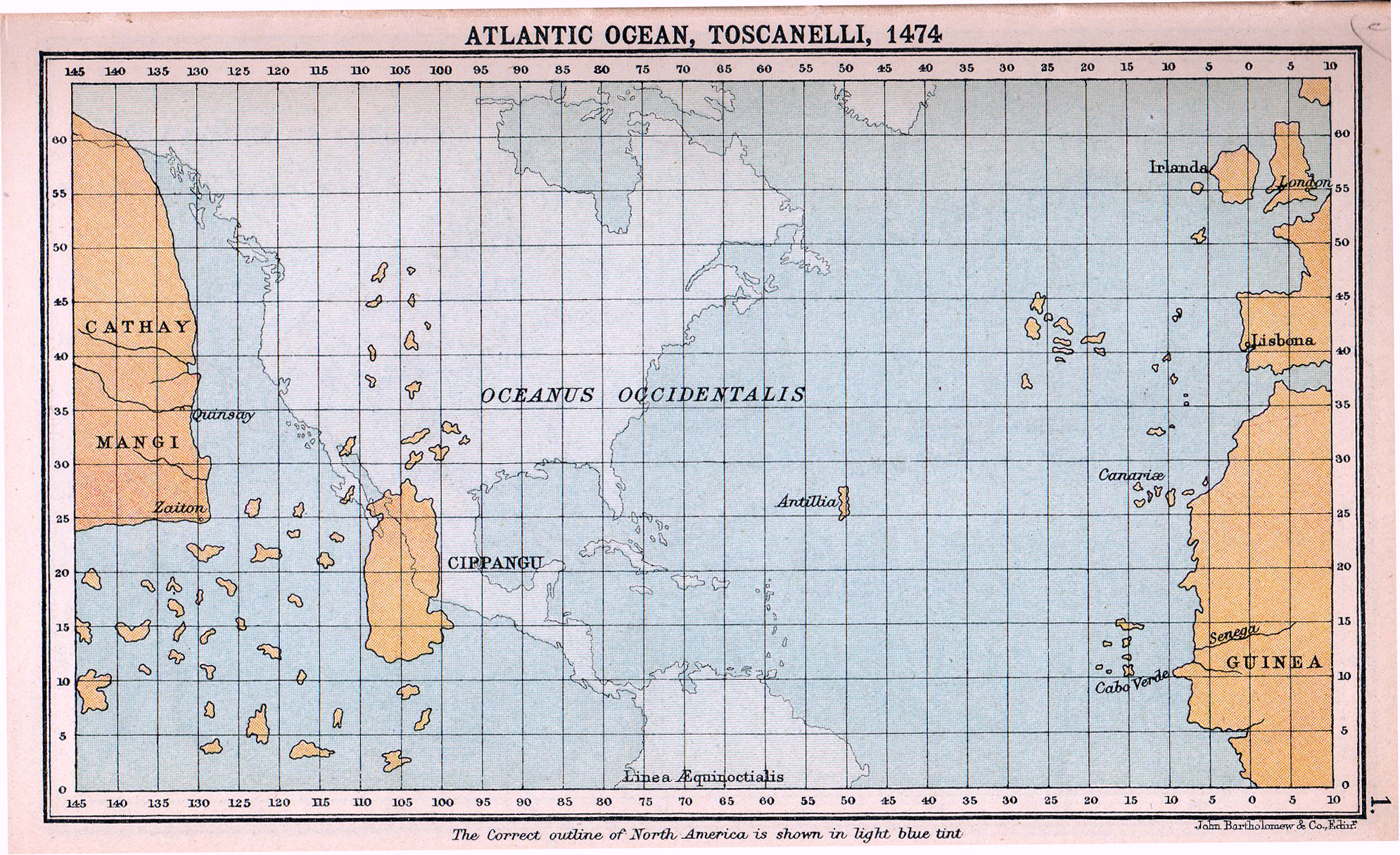
Toscanelli's notions of the geography of the Atlantic Ocean (shown superimposed on a modern map), which directly influenced Columbus's plans

Under the Mongol Empire's hegemony over Asia and the Pax Mongolica, Europeans had long enjoyed a safe land passage on the Silk Road to the Indian subcontinent, parts of East Asia (including China), and Maritime Southeast Asia, which were all sources of valuable goods. However, after the fall of Constantinople from the hands of the Christian Byzantine Empire to the Muslim Ottoman Empire in 1453, the Silk Road was closed to Christian traders.

In 1474, the Florentine astronomer Paolo dal Pozzo Toscanelli suggested to King Afonso V of Portugal that sailing west across the Atlantic would be a quicker way to reach Asia than the route around Africa, but the king rejected his proposal. In the 1480s, Columbus and his brother proposed a plan to reach the East Indies by sailing west. Columbus supposedly wrote to Toscanelli in 1481 and received encouragement, along with a copy of a map the astronomer had sent King Afonso V implying that a westward route to Asia was possible. Columbus's plans were then complicated by Bartolomeu Dias's rounding of the Cape of Good Hope in 1488, which suggested the Cape Route around Africa to Asia.

Columbus thus had to wait until 1492 for King Ferdinand and Queen Isabella of Spain to support his voyage across the Atlantic to find gold, spices, a safer route to the East, and converts to Christianity.

Carol Delaney and other commentators have argued that Columbus was a Christian millennialist and apocalypticist and that these beliefs motivated his quest for Asia in a variety of ways. Columbus often wrote about seeking gold in the log books of his voyages and writes about acquiring it "in such quantity that the sovereigns... will undertake and prepare to go conquer the Holy Sepulchre" in a fulfillment of Biblical prophecy. (Note: In an account of his fourth voyage, Columbus wrote that "Jerusalem and Mount Sion must be rebuilt by Christian hands".) Columbus often wrote about converting all races to Christianity. Abbas Hamandi argues that Columbus was motivated by the hope of "[delivering] Jerusalem from Muslim hands" by "using the resources of newly discovered lands".

=== Geographical considerations ===
Despite a popular misconception to the contrary, nearly all educated Westerners of Columbus's time knew that the Earth is spherical, a concept that had been understood since antiquity. The techniques of celestial navigation, which uses the position of the Sun and the stars in the sky, had long been in use by astronomers and were beginning to be implemented by mariners.

However, Columbus made several errors in calculating the size of the Earth, the distance the continent extended to the east, and therefore the distance to the west to reach his goal.

First, as far back as the 3rd century BC, Eratosthenes had correctly computed the circumference of the Earth by using simple geometry and studying the shadows cast by objects at two remote locations. In the 1st century BC, Posidonius confirmed Eratosthenes's results by comparing stellar observations at two separate locations. These measurements were widely known among scholars, but Ptolemy's assumption of only 500 stadia per degree of longitude on the equator (rather than the 700 of Eratosthenes) led Columbus to underestimate the size of the Earth by about a third.

"Columbus map", drawn c. 1490 in the Lisbon mapmaking workshop of Bartholomew and Christopher Columbus

Second, three cosmographical parameters determined the bounds of Columbus's enterprise: the distance across the ocean between Europe and Asia, which depended on the extent of the ecumene (the known inhabited world), i.e., the Eurasian land-mass stretching east–west between Spain and China; the circumference of the Earth and the number of miles or leagues in a degree of longitude; and that which could be inferred from the theory of the relationship between the size of the surfaces of water and land, as envisioned by the followers of Aristotle in medieval times.

From Pierre d'Ailly's Imago Mundi (1410), Columbus learned of Alfraganus's estimate that a degree of latitude (equal to approximately a degree of longitude along the equator) spanned 56 2/3 Arabic miles (approximately equal to 60 nautical miles, 111.1 kilometers), but he did not realize that this was expressed in the Arabic mile rather than the shorter Roman mile or Italian mile (about 1,480 m or 4,860 ft) which was in use in his time. Columbus therefore estimated the size of the Earth to be about 75% of Eratosthenes's calculation.

Third, most scholars of the time accepted Ptolemy's estimate that Eurasia spanned 180° longitude, rather than the actual 130° (to China) or 150° (to Japan at the latitude of Spain). Columbus believed an even higher estimate, leaving a smaller percentage for water. In d'Ailly's Imago Mundi, Columbus read Marinus of Tyre's estimate that the longitudinal span of Eurasia was 225° at the latitude of Rhodes, (i.e. the 36th parallel north). Some historians, such as Samuel Eliot Morison, have suggested that he followed the statement in the apocryphal book 2 Esdras (6:42) that "six parts [of the globe] are habitable and the seventh is covered with water." He was also aware of Marco Polo's claim that Japan (which he called "Cipangu") was some 2,414 km (1,500 mi) to the east of China ("Cathay"), and closer to the equator than it is. He was influenced by Toscanelli's idea that there were inhabited islands even farther to the east than Japan, including the mythical Antillia, which he thought might lie not much farther to the west than the Azores, and the distance westward from the Canary Islands to the Indies as only 68 degrees, equivalent to 3,080 nmi (5,700 km; 3,540 mi) (a 58% error).

Based on his sources, Columbus estimated a distance of 2,400 nmi (4,400 km; 2,800 mi) from the Canary Islands west to Japan; the actual distance is 10,600 nmi (19,600 km; 12,200 mi). No ship in the 15th century could have carried enough food and fresh water for such a long voyage, and the dangers involved in navigating through the uncharted ocean would have been formidable. Most European navigators reasonably concluded that a westward voyage from Europe to Asia was unfeasible. The Catholic Monarchs, however, having completed the Reconquista, an expensive war against the Moors in the Iberian Peninsula, were eager to obtain a competitive edge over other European countries in the quest for trade with the Indies. Columbus's project, though far-fetched, held the promise of such an advantage.

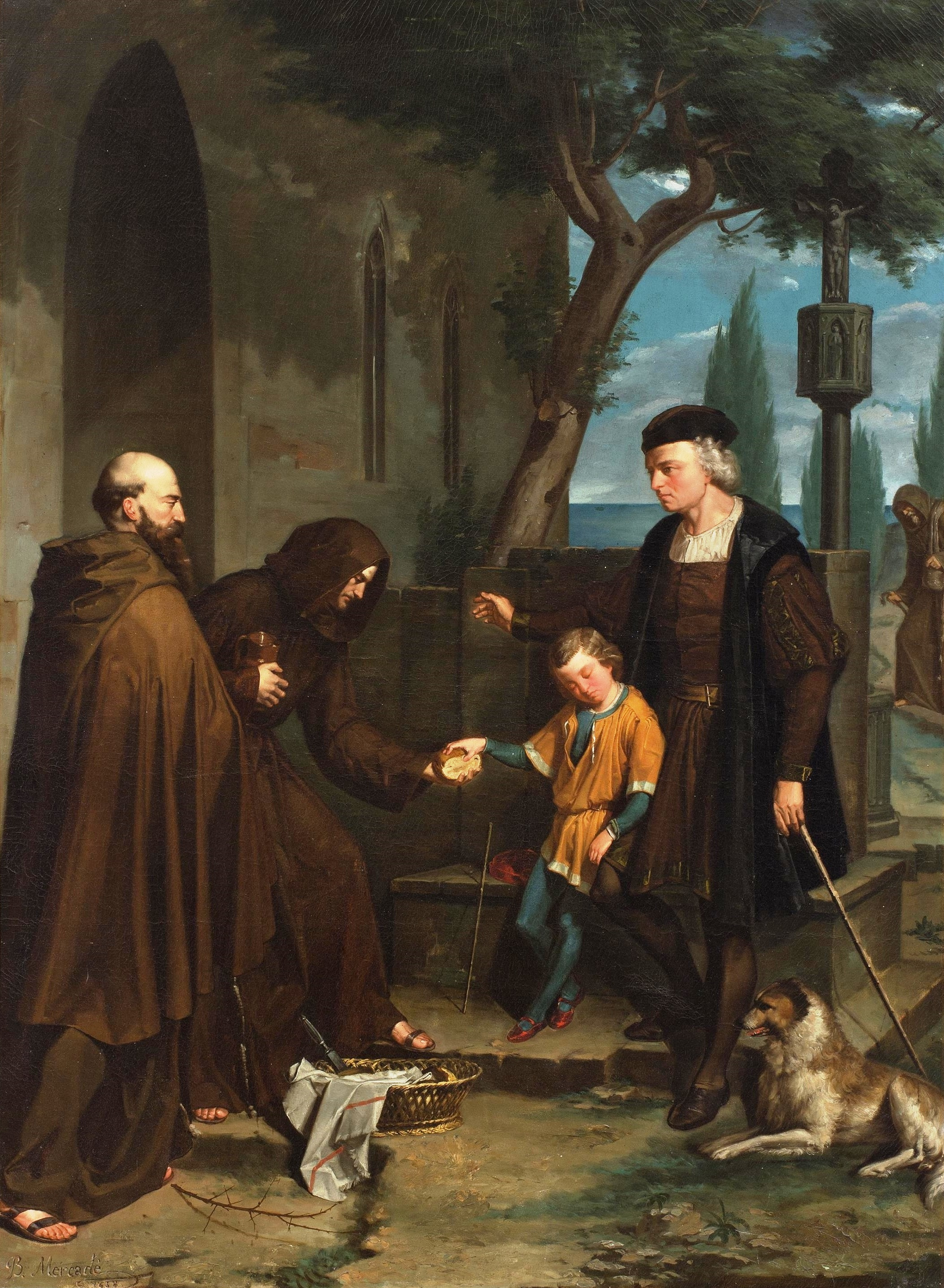
Christopher Columbus at the gates of the monastery of Santa María de la Rábida with his son Diego, by Benet Mercadé

=== Nautical considerations ===
Though Columbus was wrong about the number of degrees of longitude that separated Europe from the Far East and about the distance that each degree represented, he did take advantage of the trade winds, which would prove to be the key to his successful navigation of the Atlantic Ocean. He planned to first sail to the Canary Islands before continuing west with the northeast trade wind. Part of the return to Spain would require traveling against the wind using an arduous sailing technique called beating, during which progress is made very slowly. To effectively make the return voyage, Columbus would need to follow the curving trade winds northeastward to the middle latitudes of the North Atlantic, where he would be able to catch the westerlies that blow eastward to the coast of Western Europe.

The navigational technique for travel in the Atlantic appears to have been exploited first by the Portuguese, who referred to it as the volta do mar ('turn of the sea'). Through his marriage to Felipa Perestrello, Columbus had access to the nautical charts and logs that had belonged to her deceased father, Bartolomeu Perestrello, who had served as a captain in the Portuguese navy under Prince Henry the Navigator. In the mapmaking shop where he worked with his brother Bartholomew, Columbus also had ample opportunity to hear the stories of old seamen about their voyages to the western seas, but his knowledge of the Atlantic wind patterns was still imperfect at the time of his first voyage. By sailing due west from the Canary Islands during hurricane season, skirting the so-called horse latitudes of the mid-Atlantic, he risked being becalmed and running into a tropical cyclone, both of which he avoided by chance.

=== Quest for financial support for a voyage ===
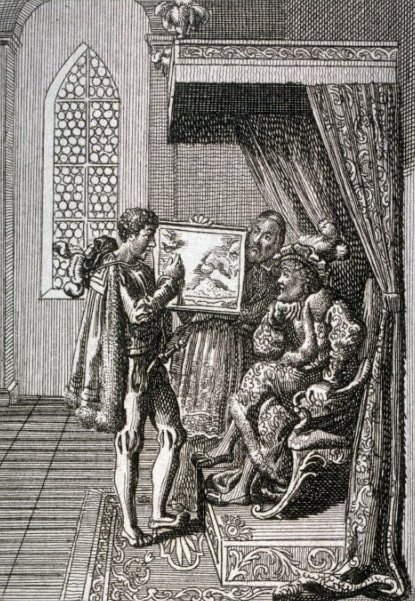
Columbus offers his services to the King of Portugal; Chodowiecki, 17th century

By about 1484, Columbus proposed his planned voyage to King John II of Portugal. The king submitted Columbus's proposal to his advisors, who rejected it, correctly, on the grounds that Columbus's estimate for a voyage of 2,400 nmi was only a quarter of what it should have been. In 1488, Columbus again appealed to the court of Portugal, and John II again granted him an audience. That meeting also proved unsuccessful, in part because not long afterwards Bartolomeu Dias returned to Portugal with news of his successful rounding of the southern tip of Africa (near the Cape of Good Hope).

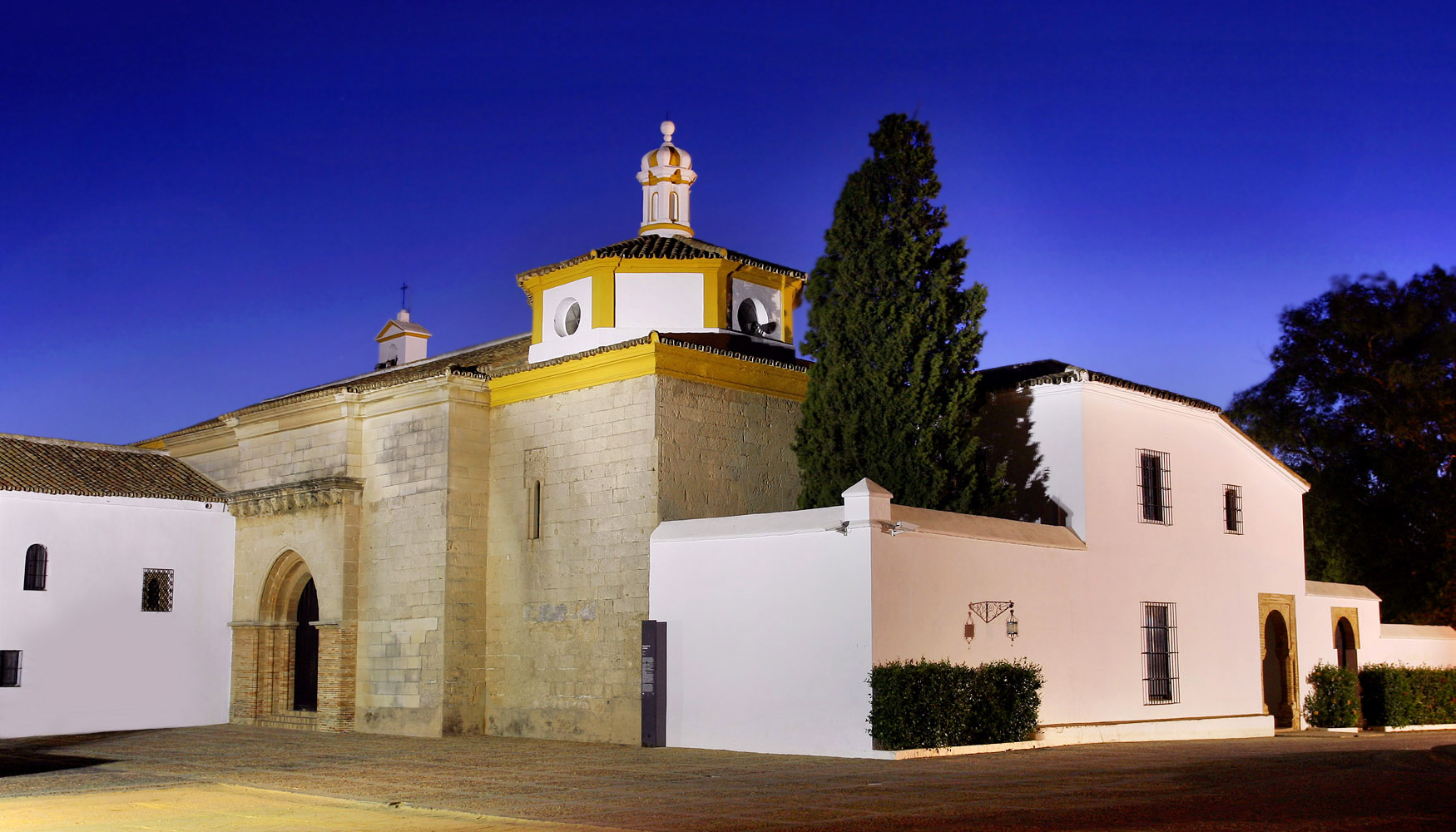
Monastery of La Rábida, in which Columbus stayed in the years before his first expedition

Columbus sought an audience with the monarchs Ferdinand II of Aragon and Isabella I of Castile, who had united several kingdoms in the Iberian Peninsula by marrying and now ruled together. On 1 May 1486, permission having been granted, Columbus presented his plans to Queen Isabella, who in turn referred it to a committee. The learned men of Spain, like their counterparts in Portugal, replied that Columbus had grossly underestimated the distance to Asia. They pronounced the idea impractical and advised the Catholic Monarchs to pass on the proposed venture. To keep Columbus from taking his ideas elsewhere, and perhaps to keep their options open, the sovereigns gave him an allowance, totaling about 14,000 maravedís for the year, or about the annual salary of a sailor. In May 1489, the queen sent him another 10,000 maravedís, and the same year the monarchs furnished him with a letter ordering all cities and towns under their dominion to provide him food and lodging at no cost.

Columbus also dispatched his brother Bartholomew to the court of Henry VII of England to inquire whether the English Crown might sponsor his expedition, but he was captured by pirates en route, and did not arrive until early in 1491. By that time, Columbus had retreated to La Rábida Friary, where the Spanish Crown sent him another 20,000 maravedís to buy new clothes and instructions to return to the Spanish court for renewed discussions.

=== Agreement with the Spanish Crown ===
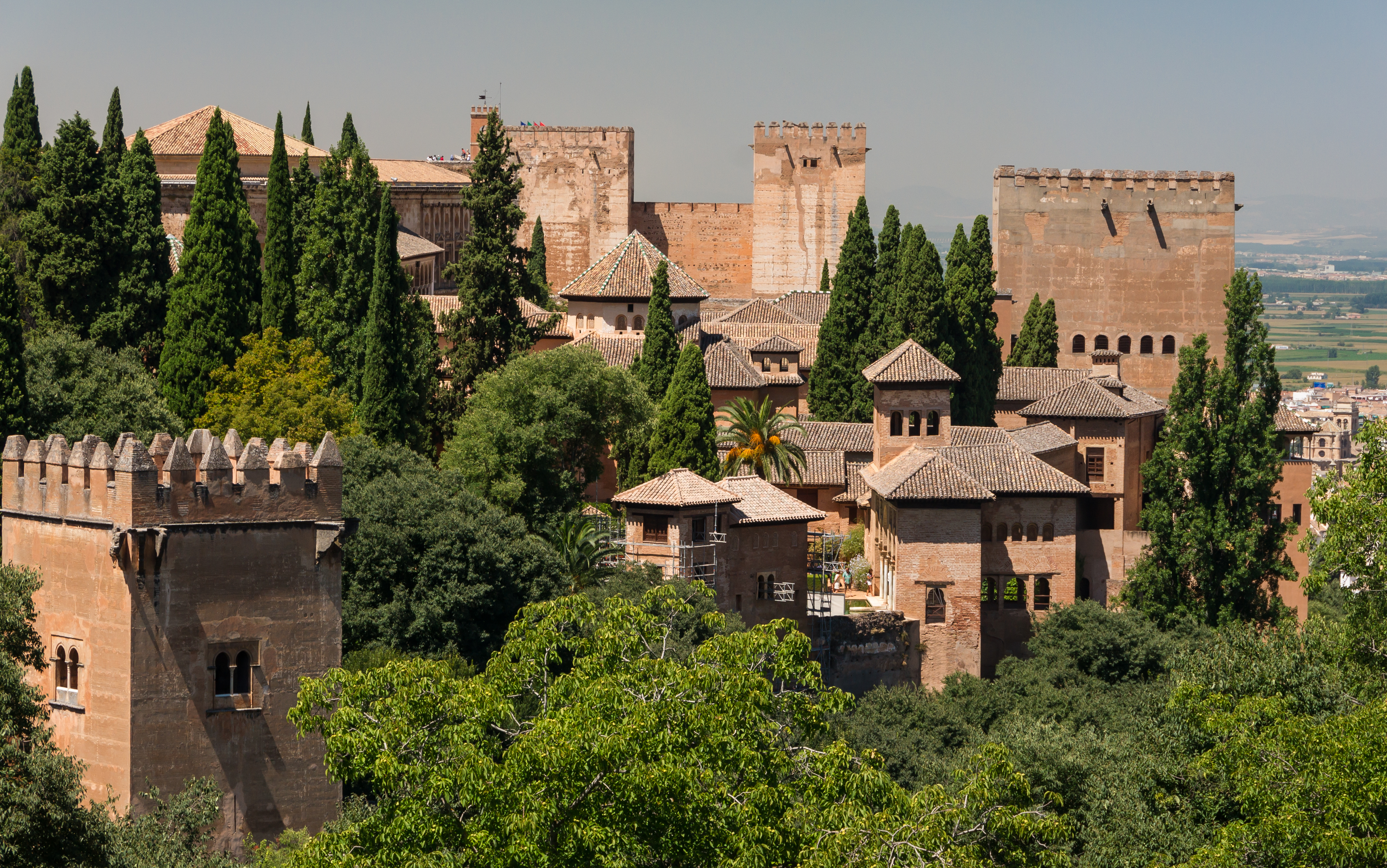
The Alhambra, where Columbus received permission from the Catholic Monarchs for his first voyage

Columbus waited at King Ferdinand's camp until Ferdinand and Isabella conquered Granada, the last Muslim stronghold on the Iberian Peninsula, in January 1492. A council led by Isabella's confessor, Hernando de Talavera, found Columbus's proposal to reach the Indies implausible. Columbus had left for France when Ferdinand intervened, (Note: Ferdinand later claimed credit for being "the principal cause why those islands were discovered.") first sending Talavera and Bishop Diego Deza to appeal to the queen. Isabella was finally convinced by the king's clerk Luis de Santángel, who argued that Columbus would take his ideas elsewhere, and offered to help arrange the funding. Isabella then sent a royal guard to fetch Columbus, who had traveled two leagues (over 10 km) toward Córdoba.

In the "Capitulations of Santa Fe" of April 1492, King Ferdinand and Queen Isabella promised Columbus that if he succeeded, he would be given the rank of "Admiral of the Ocean Sea" (Spanish: Almirante del Mar Océano) and appointed Viceroy and Governor of all the new lands he might claim for Spain. He had the right to nominate three persons, from whom the sovereigns would choose one, for any office in the new lands. He would be entitled to one-tenth (diezmo) of all the revenues from the new lands in perpetuity. He also would have the option of buying one-eighth interest in any commercial venture in the new lands, and receive one-eighth (ochavo) of the profits.

In 1500, during his third voyage to the Americas, Columbus was arrested and dismissed from his posts. He and his sons, Diego and Fernando, then conducted a lengthy series of court cases against the Castilian Crown, known as the pleitos colombinos, alleging that the Crown had illegally reneged on its contractual obligations to Columbus and his heirs. The Columbus family had some success in their first litigation, as a judgment of 1511 confirmed Diego's position as viceroy but reduced his powers. Diego resumed litigation in 1512, which lasted until 1536, and further disputes initiated by heirs continued until 1790.

== Voyages ==
The voyages of Christopher Columbus (conjectural)

Between 1492 and 1504, Columbus completed four round-trip voyages between Spain and the Americas, each voyage being sponsored by the Crown of Castile. On his first voyage he reached the Americas, initiating the European exploration and colonization of the continent, as well as the Columbian exchange. His role in history is thus important to the Age of Discovery, Western history, and human history writ large.

In Columbus's letter on the first voyage, published following his first return to Spain, he claimed that he had reached Asia, as previously described by Marco Polo and other Europeans. Over his subsequent voyages, Columbus refused to acknowledge that the lands he visited and claimed for Spain were not part of Asia, in the face of mounting evidence to the contrary. This might explain, in part, why the American continent was named after the Florentine explorer Amerigo Vespucci—who received credit for recognizing it as a "New World"—and not after Columbus. (Note: Felipe Fernández-Armesto points out that Columbus briefly described South America as an unknown continent after seeing the mainland for the first time. Vespucci seems to have modeled his naming of the "new world" after Columbus's description of this discovery. Further, mapmaker Martin Waldseemüller eventually retracted his naming of the continent after Vespucci, seemingly after it came to light that a claim that Vespucci visited the mainland before Columbus had been falsified. In his new map, Waldseemüller labelled the continent as Terra Incognita ('unknown land'), noting that it had been discovered by Columbus.)

=== First voyage (1492–1493) ===
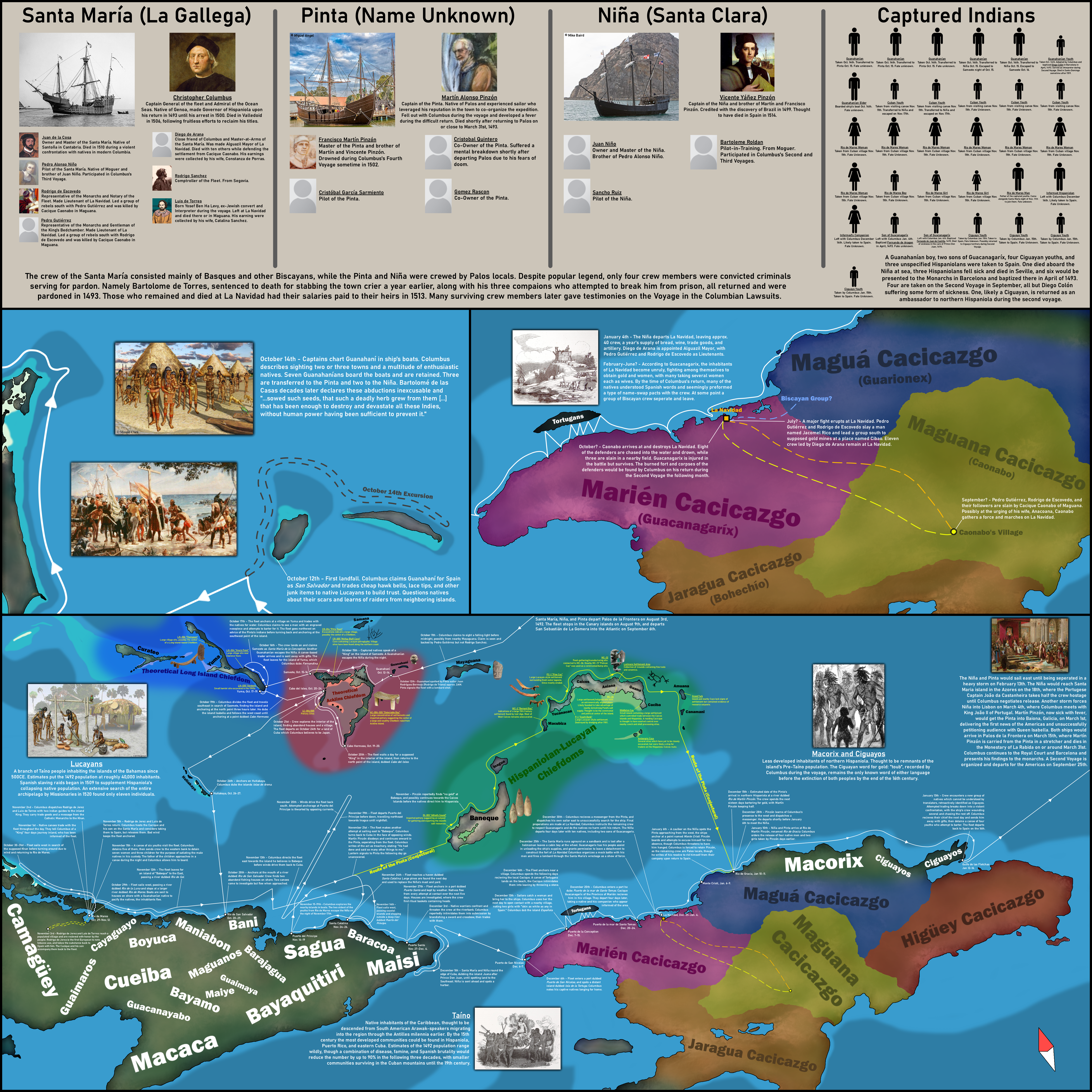
Route of the First Voyage through the Caribbean with contextual information, assuming a landfall in Plana Cays as proposed by Keith Pickering. Lucayan chiefdoms are based on archeological evidence and Columbus's accounts.

Captain's ensign of Columbus's ships

On the evening of 3 August 1492, Columbus departed from Palos de la Frontera with three ships. The largest was a carrack, the Santa María, owned and captained by Juan de la Cosa, and under Columbus's direct command. The other two were smaller caravels, the Pinta and the Niña, piloted by the Pinzón brothers. Columbus first sailed to the Canary Islands. There he restocked provisions and made repairs then departed from San Sebastián de La Gomera on 6 September, for what turned out to be a five-week voyage across the ocean. On 7 October, the crew spotted "[i]mmense flocks of birds". On 11 October, Columbus changed the fleet's course to due west, and sailed through the night, believing land was soon to be found. At around 02:00 the following morning, a lookout on the Pinta, Rodrigo de Triana, spotted land. The captain of the Pinta, Martín Alonso Pinzón, verified the sight of land and alerted Columbus. Columbus later maintained that he had already seen a light on the land a few hours earlier, thereby claiming for himself the lifetime pension promised by Ferdinand and Isabella to the first person to sight land. Columbus called this island (in what is now the Bahamas) San Salvador ('Holy Savior'); its inhabitants called it Guanahani. (Note: According to Samuel Eliot Morison, San Salvador Island, renamed from Watling's Island in 1925 in the belief that it was Columbus's San Salvador, is the only island fitting the position indicated by Columbus's journal. Other candidates are the Grand Turk, Cat Island, Rum Cay, Samana Cay, or Mayaguana.) Christopher Columbus's journal entry of 12 October 1492 states:

I saw some who had marks of wounds on their bodies and I made signs to them asking what they were; and they showed me how people from other islands nearby came there and tried to take them, and how they defended themselves; and I believed and believe that they come here from tierra firme to take them captive. They should be good and intelligent servants, for I see that they say very quickly everything that is said to them; and I believe they would become Christians very easily, for it seemed to me that they had no religion. Our Lord pleasing, at the time of my departure I will take six of them from here to Your Highnesses in order that they may learn to speak.

Columbus called the inhabitants of the lands that he visited Los Indios ("Indians"). He initially encountered the Lucayan, Taíno, and Arawak peoples. Noting their gold ear ornaments, Columbus took some of the Arawaks prisoner and insisted that they guide him to the source of the gold. Columbus did not believe he needed to create a fortified outpost, writing, "the people here are simple in war-like matters ... I could conquer the whole of them with fifty men, and govern them as I pleased." The Taínos told Columbus that another indigenous tribe, the Caribs, were fierce warriors and cannibals, who made frequent raids on the Taínos, often capturing their women, although this may have been a belief perpetuated by the Spaniards to justify enslaving them.

Columbus also explored the northeast coast of Cuba, where he landed on 28 October. On the night of 26 November, Martín Alonso Pinzón took the Pinta on an unauthorized expedition in search of an island called "Babeque" or "Baneque", which the natives had told him was rich in gold. Columbus, for his part, continued to the northern coast of Hispaniola, where he landed on 6 December. There, the Santa María ran aground on 25 December 1492 and had to be abandoned. The wreck was used as a target for cannon fire to impress the island's inhabitants. Columbus was received by the local cacique Guacanagari, who gave him permission to leave some of his men behind. Columbus left 39 men, including the interpreter Luis de Torres, (Note: Luis de Torres had been a converso, a Jewish person who was forced to convert to Christianity or be put to death according to the Spanish Inquisition; as such, he spoke Hebrew and some Arabic, and the latter was then believed to be the mother tongue of all languages. Columbus also felt that de Torres's languages would prove useful, as he believed they would encounter the descendants of the Lost Tribes of Israel.) and founded the settlement of La Navidad, in present-day Haiti. Columbus took more natives prisoner and continued his exploration. He kept sailing along the northern coast of Hispaniola with a single ship until he encountered Pinzón and the Pinta on 6 January.

On 13 January 1493, Columbus made his last stop of this voyage in the Americas, in the Bay of Rincón in northeast Hispaniola. There he encountered the Ciguayos, the only natives who offered violent resistance during this voyage. The Ciguayos refused to trade the amount of bows and arrows that Columbus desired; in the ensuing clash, one Ciguayo was stabbed in the buttocks and another wounded with an arrow in his chest. Because of these events, Columbus called the inlet the Golfo de Las Flechas ("Bay of Arrows").

Columbus headed for Spain on the Niña, but a storm separated him from the Pinta, and forced the Niña to stop at Santa Maria Island in the Azores. Half of his crew went ashore to say prayers of thanksgiving in a chapel for having survived the storm. But while praying, they were imprisoned by the governor of the island, ostensibly on suspicion of being pirates. After a two-day stand-off, the prisoners were released, and Columbus again set sail for Spain.

Another storm forced Columbus into the port at Lisbon. From there he went to Vale do Paraíso north of Lisbon to meet King John II of Portugal, who told Columbus that he believed the voyage to be in violation of the 1479 Treaty of Alcáçovas. After spending more than a week in Portugal, Columbus set sail for Spain. Returning to Palos on 15 March 1493, he was given a hero's welcome and soon afterward received by Isabella and Ferdinand in Barcelona. To them, he presented kidnapped Taínos and various plants and items he had collected.

One of the ten natives taken on the return trip was a Lucayan from Guanahani thought to be 13–15 years of age, who Columbus adopted as his son upon their arrival in Spain; the boy, whose Lucayan name is unknown, received the name Diego at baptism. Initially, Diego had been recognized for his intelligence and rapid acquisition of Spanish customs, and would serve as a guide and interpreter on each of Columbus's subsequent voyages. By the second voyage's departure later in 1493, Diego was the only native out of the ten taken to Europe who had not died or become seriously ill as the result of disease; while on this voyage, he played a vital role in the discovery of La Navidad. He subsequently married and had a son, also named Diego, who died of illness in 1506. Following Columbus's death, Diego spent the rest of his life confined to Santo Domingo, and does not reappear in the historical record following a smallpox epidemic that swept Hispaniola in 1519.

Columbus's letter on the first voyage, probably dispatched to the Spanish court upon arrival in Lisbon, was instrumental in spreading the news throughout Europe about his voyage. Almost immediately after his arrival in Spain, printed versions began to appear, and word of his voyage spread rapidly. Most people initially believed that he had reached Asia. The Bulls of Donation, three papal bulls of Pope Alexander VI delivered in 1493, purported to grant overseas territories to Portugal and the Catholic Monarchs of Spain. They were replaced by the Treaty of Tordesillas of 1494.

The two earliest published copies of Columbus's letter on the first voyage aboard the Niña were donated in 2017 by the Jay I. Kislak Foundation to the University of Miami library in Coral Gables, Florida, where they are housed.

=== Second voyage (1493–1496) ===
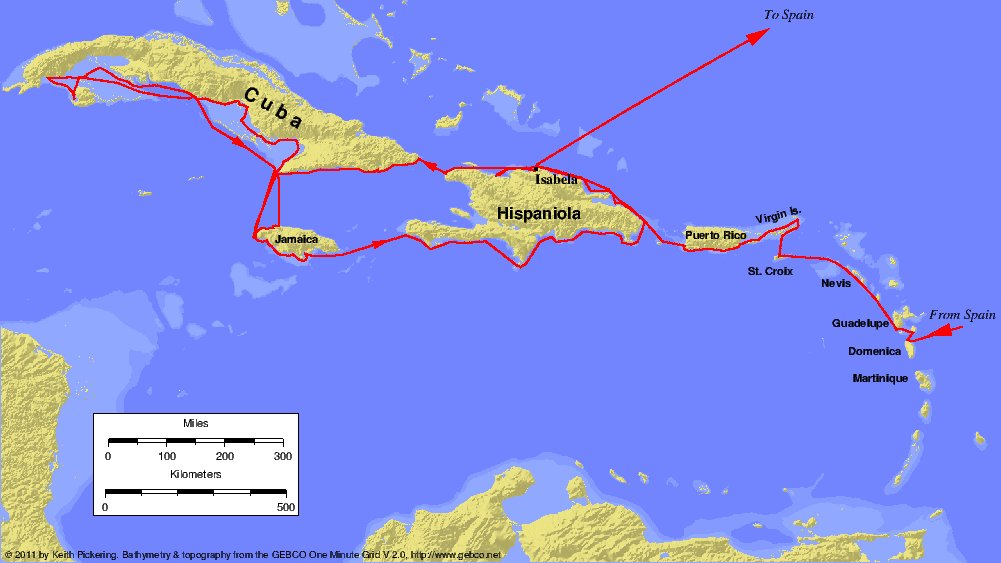
Columbus's second voyage (Note: Omitted from this image, Columbus returned to Guadeloupe at the end of his second voyage before sailing back to Spain.)

On 24 September 1493, just over six months after returning to Spain from the New World, Columbus set sail from the Spanish port city of Cádiz with 17 ships and enough supplies to establish permanent colonies in the Americas. He sailed with nearly 1,500 men, including sailors, soldiers, priests, doctors, carpenters, stonemasons, metalworkers, and farmers. Among the expedition members were Diego Álvarez Chanca, a physician who wrote a detailed account of the second voyage; Juan Ponce de León, a nobleman who would go on to serve as the first governor of Puerto Rico and lead the first European expedition to Spanish Florida; Pedro de las Casas, the father of clergyman (and later prominent defender of natives' rights) Bartolomé de las Casas; Juan de la Cosa, a veteran of the first voyage and cartographer, who is credited with making the first world map depicting the New World; and Columbus's youngest brother Diego. The fleet stopped at the Canary Islands to take on more supplies, and set sail again on 7 October, deliberately taking a more southerly course than on the first voyage.

On 3 November, they arrived in the Windward Islands; the first island they encountered was named Dominica by Columbus, but not finding a good harbor there, they anchored off a nearby smaller island, which he named Mariagalante, now a part of Guadeloupe and called Marie-Galante. Other islands named by Columbus on this voyage were Montserrat, Antigua, Saint Martin, and the Virgin Islands, as well as many others.

On 17 November, Columbus first sighted the eastern coast of the island of Puerto Rico, known to its indigenous Taíno people as Boriquen. His fleet sailed along the island's southern coast for a whole day, before making landfall on its northwestern coast at the Bay of Añasco, early on 19 November. Upon landing, Columbus christened the island San Juan Bautista after John the Baptist, and remained anchored there for two days from 20 to 21 November, filling the water casks of the ships in his fleet.

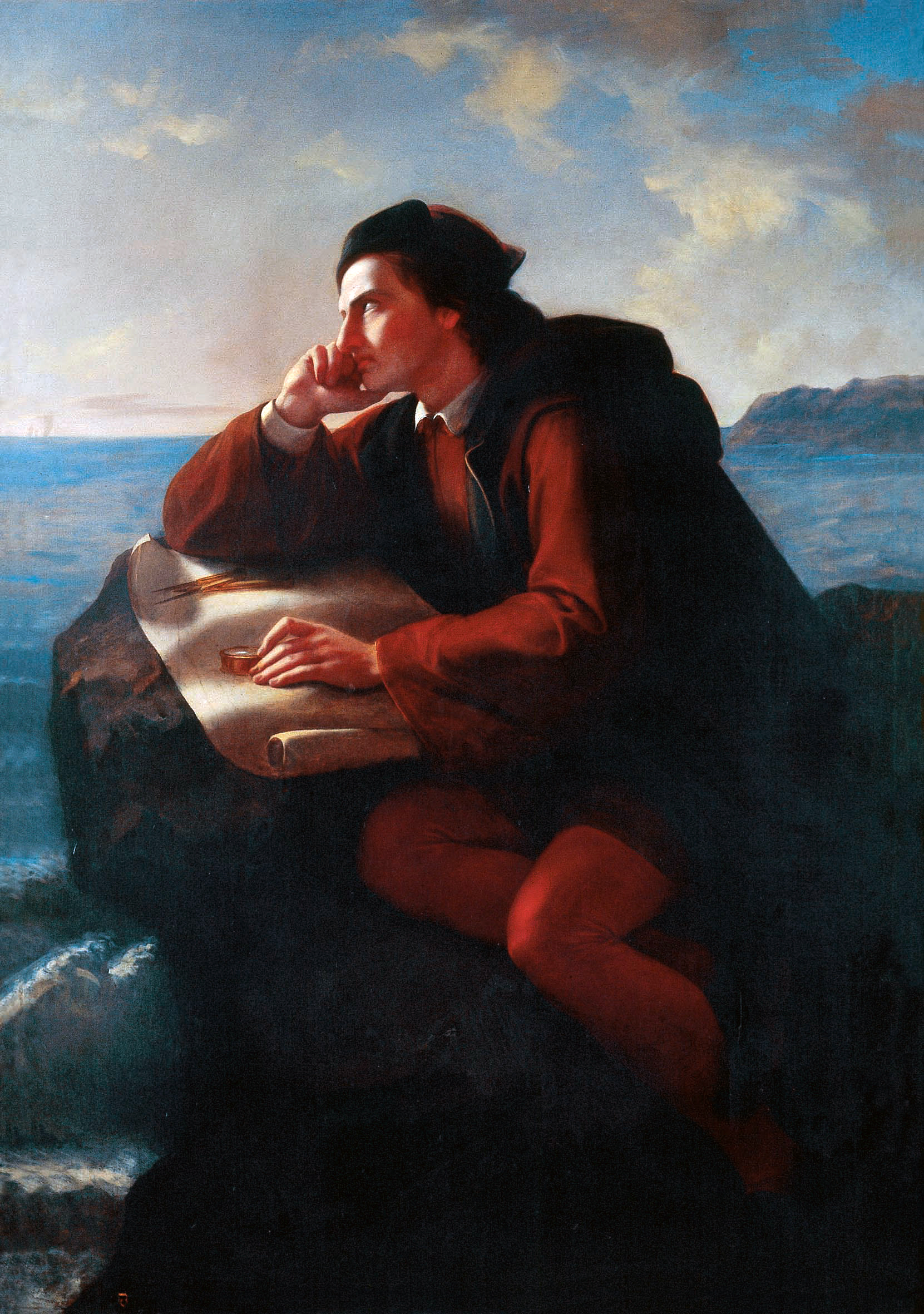
The Inspiration of Christopher Columbus by José María Obregón, 1856

On 22 November, Columbus returned to Hispaniola to visit La Navidad in modern-day Haiti, where 39 Spaniards had been left during the first voyage. Columbus found the fort in ruins. He learned from Guacanagaríx, the local tribe leader, that his men had quarreled over gold and taken women from the tribe, and that after some left for the territory of Caonabo, Caonabo came and burned the fort and killed the rest of the men there.

Columbus then established a poorly-located and short-lived settlement to the east, La Isabela, in the present-day Dominican Republic. By the end of 1494, disease and famine had killed two-thirds of the Spanish settlers there.

From April to August 1494, Columbus explored Cuba and Jamaica, then returned to Hispaniola. Before leaving on this exploration to Cuba, Columbus had ordered a large number of men, under Pedro Margarit, to "journey the length and breadth of the island, enforcing Spanish control and bringing all the people under the Spanish yoke." These men, in his absence, raped women, took men captive to be servants, and stole from the native inhabitants. A number of Spanish were killed in retaliation. By the time Columbus returned from exploring Cuba, the four primary leaders of the Arawak people in Hispaniola were gathering for war to try to drive the Spanish from the Island. Columbus assembled a large number of troops, and joined by his local ally, chief Guacanagaríx, met for battle. The Spanish, even though they were largely outnumbered, won the battle, and over the next 9 months Columbus continued to wage war on Hispanolia's Taíno until they surrendered and agreed to pay tribute.

Columbus implemented encomienda, a Spanish labor system that rewarded conquerors with the labor of conquered non-Christian people. It is also recorded that punishments to both Spaniards and Native Americans included whippings and mutilation (such as cutting off noses and ears).

Columbus and the colonists enslaved many of the indigenous people, including children. Natives were beaten, raped, and tortured for the location of imagined gold. Thousands committed suicide rather than face the oppression. (Note: The tribute system had all but collapsed by 1497.)

In February 1495, Columbus rounded up about 1,500 Arawaks, some of whom had rebelled, in a great slave raid. About 500 of the strongest were shipped to Spain as slaves, with about two hundred of those dying en route.

In June 1495, the Spanish Crown sent ships and supplies to Hispaniola. In October, Florentine merchant Gianotto Berardi, who had won the contract to provision the fleet of Columbus's second voyage and to supply the colony on Hispaniola, received almost 40,000 maravedís worth of enslaved Indians. He renewed his effort to get supplies to Columbus, and was working to organize a fleet when he suddenly died in December. On 10 March 1496, having been away about 30 months, the fleet departed La Isabela. On 8 June, the crew sighted land somewhere between Lisbon and Cape St. Vincent, and disembarked in Cádiz on 11 June.

=== Third voyage (1498–1500) ===
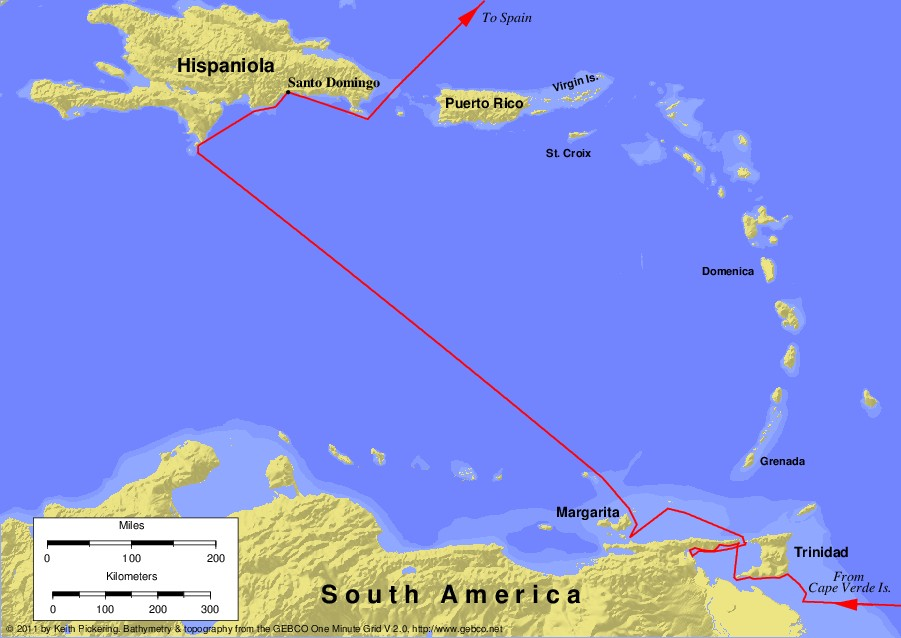
Third voyage

On 30 May 1498, Columbus left with six ships from Sanlúcar, Spain. The fleet called at Madeira and the Canary Islands, where it divided in two, with three ships heading for Hispaniola and the other three vessels, commanded by Columbus, sailing south to the Cape Verde Islands and then westward across the Atlantic. It is probable that this expedition was intended at least partly to confirm rumors of a large continent south of the Caribbean Sea, that is, South America.

On 31 July they sighted Trinidad, the most southerly of the Caribbean islands. On 5 August, Columbus sent several small boats ashore on the southern side of the Paria Peninsula in what is now Venezuela, near the mouth of the Orinoco river. This was the first recorded landing of Europeans on the mainland of South America, which Columbus realized must be a continent. The fleet then sailed to the islands of Chacachacare and Margarita, reaching the latter on 14 August, and sighted Tobago and Grenada from afar, according to some scholars.

On 19 August, Columbus returned to Hispaniola. There he found settlers in rebellion against his rule, and his unfulfilled promises of riches. Columbus had some of the Europeans tried for their disobedience; at least one rebel leader was hanged.

In October 1499, Columbus sent two ships to Spain, asking the Court of Spain to appoint a royal commissioner to help him govern. By this time, accusations of tyranny and incompetence on the part of Columbus had also reached the Court. The sovereigns sent Francisco de Bobadilla, a relative of Marquesa Beatriz de Bobadilla, a patron of Columbus and a close friend of Queen Isabella, to investigate the accusations of brutality made against the Admiral. Arriving in Santo Domingo while Columbus was away, Bobadilla was immediately met with complaints about all three Columbus brothers. He moved into Columbus's house and seized his property, took depositions from the Admiral's enemies, and declared himself governor.

Bobadilla reported to Spain that Columbus once punished a man found guilty of stealing corn by having his ears and nose cut off and then selling him into slavery. He claimed that Columbus regularly used torture and mutilation to govern Hispaniola. (Note: Bobadilla's 48-page report—derived from the testimonies of 23 people who had seen or heard about the treatment meted out by Columbus and his brothers—had originally been lost for centuries, but was rediscovered in 2005 in the Spanish archives in Valladolid. It contained an account of Columbus's seven-year reign as the first governor of the Indies. Consuelo Varela, a Spanish historian, states: "Even those who loved him [Columbus] had to admit the atrocities that had taken place.") Testimony recorded in the report stated that Columbus congratulated his brother Bartholomew on "defending the family" when the latter ordered for a woman to be paraded naked through the streets and then had her tongue cut because she had "spoken ill of the admiral and his brothers". The document also describes how Columbus put down native unrest and revolt: he first ordered a brutal suppression of the uprising in which many natives were killed, and then paraded their dismembered bodies through the streets in an attempt to discourage further rebellion. Columbus vehemently denied the charges. The neutrality and accuracy of the accusations and investigations of Bobadilla toward Columbus and his brothers have been disputed by historians, given the anti-Italian sentiment of the Spaniards and Bobadilla's desire to take over Columbus's position.

In early October 1500, Columbus and Diego presented themselves to Bobadilla, and were put in chains aboard La Gorda, the caravel on which Bobadilla had arrived at Santo Domingo. They were returned to Spain, and languished in jail for six weeks before King Ferdinand ordered their release. Not long after, the king and queen summoned the Columbus brothers to the Alhambra palace in Granada. The sovereigns expressed indignation at the actions of Bobadilla, who was then recalled and ordered to make restitutions of the property he had confiscated from Columbus. The royal couple heard the brothers' pleas; restored their freedom and wealth; and, after much persuasion, agreed to fund Columbus's fourth voyage. However, Nicolás de Ovando was to replace Bobadilla and be the new governor of the West Indies.

New light was shed on the seizure of Columbus and his brother Bartholomew, the Adelantado, with the discovery by archivist Isabel Aguirre of an incomplete copy of the testimonies against them gathered by Francisco de Bobadilla at Santo Domingo in 1500. She found a manuscript copy of this pesquisa (inquiry) ‌in the Archive of Simancas, Spain, uncatalogued until she and Consuelo Varela published their book, La caída de Cristóbal Colón: el juicio de Bobadilla (The fall of Christopher Colón: the judgement of Bobadilla) in 2006.

=== Fourth voyage (1502–1504) ===
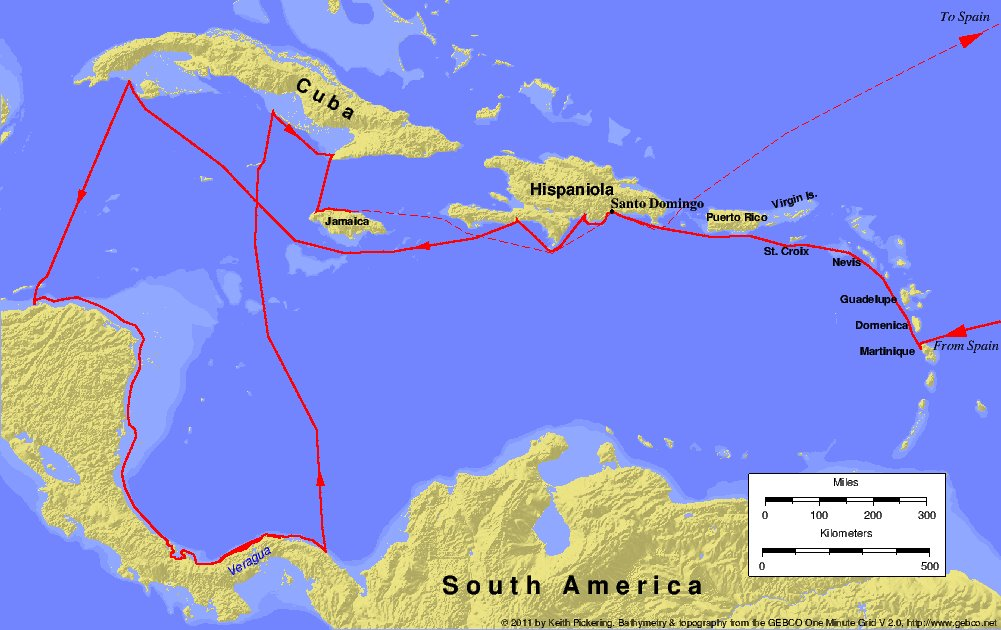
Columbus's fourth voyage

Coat of arms granted to Christopher Columbus and the House of Colon by Pope Alexander VI motu proprio in 1502

On 9 May 1502, (Note: Some scholars, including Sauer, say the fleet sailed 11 May; Cook says 9 May.) Columbus left Cádiz with his flagship Santa María and three other vessels. The ships were crewed by 140 men, including his brother Bartholomew as second in command and his son Fernando. He sailed to Asilah on the Moroccan coast to rescue Portuguese soldiers said to be besieged by the Moors. The siege had been lifted by the time they arrived, so the Spaniards stayed only a day and continued on to the Canary Islands.

On 15 June, the fleet arrived at Martinique, where it lingered for several days. A hurricane was forming, so Columbus continued westward, hoping to find shelter on Hispaniola. He arrived at Santo Domingo on 29 June, but was denied port, and the new governor Francisco de Bobadilla refused to listen to his warning that a hurricane was approaching. Instead, while Columbus's ships sheltered at the mouth of the Rio Jaina, the first Spanish treasure fleet sailed into the hurricane. Columbus's ships survived with only minor damage, while 20 of the 30 ships in the governor's fleet were lost along with 500 lives (including that of Francisco de Bobadilla). Although a few surviving ships managed to straggle back to Santo Domingo, Aguja, the fragile ship carrying Columbus's personal belongings and his 4,000 pesos in gold was the sole vessel to reach Spain. The gold was his tenth (décimo) of the profits from Hispaniola, equal to 240,000 maravedís, guaranteed by the Catholic Monarchs in 1492.

After a brief stop at Jamaica, Columbus sailed to Central America, arriving at the coast of Honduras on 30 July. Here Bartholomew found native merchants and a large canoe. On 14 August, Columbus landed on the continental mainland at Punta Caxinas, now Puerto Castilla, Honduras. He spent two months exploring the coasts of Honduras, Nicaragua, and Costa Rica, seeking a strait in the western Caribbean through which he could sail to the Indian Ocean. Sailing south along the Nicaraguan coast, he found a channel that led into Almirante Bay in Panama on 5 October.

As soon as his ships anchored in Almirante Bay, Columbus encountered Ngäbe people in canoes who were wearing gold ornaments. In January 1503, he established a garrison at the mouth of the Belén River. Columbus left for Hispaniola on 16 April. On 10 May he sighted the Cayman Islands, naming them Las Tortugas after the numerous sea turtles there. His ships sustained damage in a storm off the coast of Cuba. Unable to travel farther, on 25 June 1503 they were beached in Saint Ann Parish, Jamaica.

For six months, Columbus and 230 of his men remained stranded on Jamaica. Diego Méndez de Segura, a personal secretary to Columbus, and a Spanish shipmate called Bartolomé Flisco, along with six natives, paddled a canoe to get help from Hispaniola. However, the governor, Nicolás de Ovando y Cáceres, detested Columbus and obstructed all efforts to rescue him and his men. In the meantime, Columbus, in a desperate effort to induce the inhabitants to continue provisioning him and his hungry men, won their favor by predicting a lunar eclipse for 29 February 1504, using Abraham Zacuto's astronomical charts. Despite the governor's obstruction, Christopher Columbus and his men were rescued on 28 June 1504, just over a year after being stranded on Jamaica, and arrived in Sanlúcar, Spain, on 7 November 1504.

== Later life, illness, and death ==
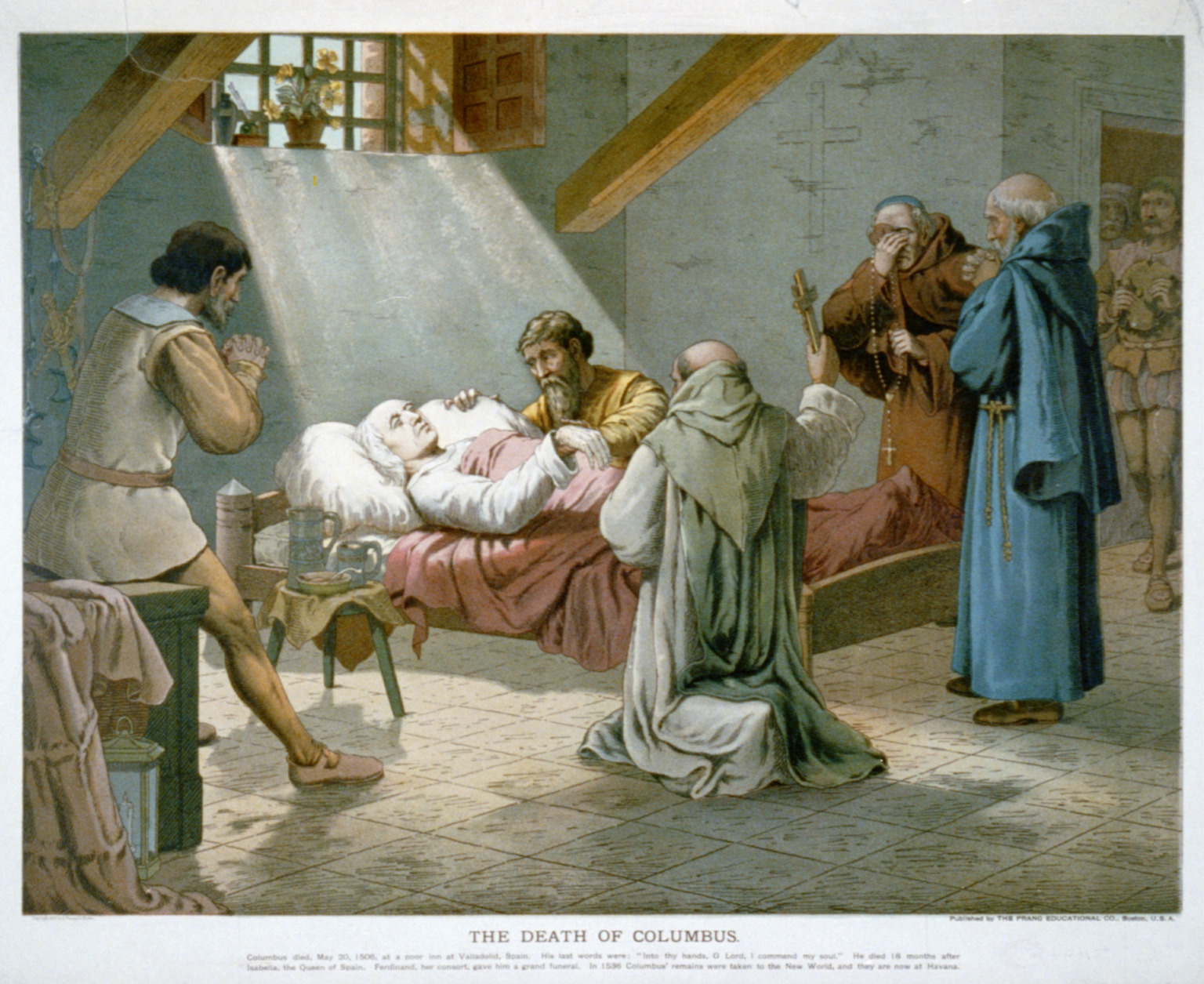
The death of Columbus, lithograph by L. Prang & Co., 1893

Columbus had always claimed that the conversion of non-Christian believers was one reason for his explorations, and he grew increasingly religious in his later years. Probably with the assistance of his son Diego and his friend the Carthusian monk Gaspar Gorricio, Columbus produced two books during his later years: a Book of Privileges (1502), detailing and documenting the rewards from the Spanish Crown to which he believed he and his heirs were entitled, and a Book of Prophecies (1505), in which passages from the Bible were used to place his achievements as an explorer in the context of Christian eschatology.

In his later years, Columbus demanded that the Crown of Castile give him his tenth of all the riches and trade goods yielded by the new lands, as stipulated in the Capitulations of Santa Fe. Because he had been relieved of his duties as governor, the Crown did not feel bound by that contract and his demands were rejected. After his death, his heirs sued the Crown for a part of the profits from trade with America, as well as other rewards. This led to a protracted series of legal disputes known as the pleitos colombinos ("Columbian lawsuits").

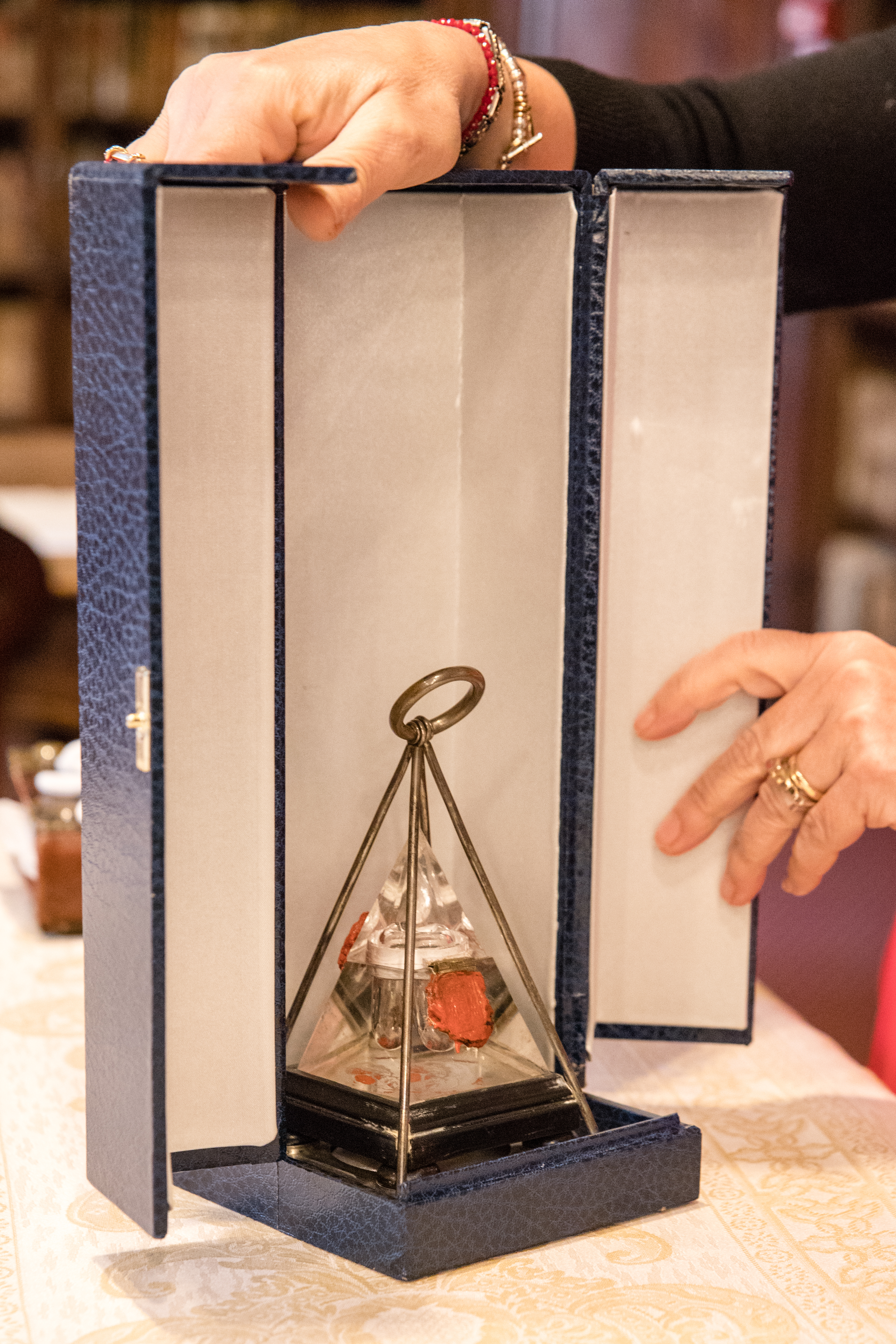
The remains of Christopher Columbus preserved in the University Library of Pavia

During a violent storm on his first return voyage, Columbus, then 41, had suffered an attack of what was believed at the time to be gout. In subsequent years, he was plagued with what was thought to be influenza and other fevers, bleeding from the eyes, temporary blindness and prolonged attacks of gout. The attacks increased in duration and severity, sometimes leaving Columbus bedridden for months at a time, and culminated in his death 14 years later.

Based on Columbus's lifestyle and the described symptoms, some modern commentators suspect that he suffered from reactive arthritis, rather than gout. Reactive arthritis is a joint inflammation caused by intestinal bacterial infections or after acquiring certain sexually transmitted diseases (primarily chlamydia or gonorrhea). In 2006, Frank C. Arnett, a rheumatologist, and historian Charles Merrill published their paper in The American Journal of the Medical Sciences proposing that Columbus had a form of reactive arthritis; Merrill hypothesized, "It seems likely that [Columbus] acquired reactive arthritis from food poisoning on one of his ocean voyages because of poor sanitation and improper food preparation".

After his arrival to Sanlúcar during his fourth voyage (and Queen Isabella's death), an ill Columbus settled in Seville in April 1505. There, he continued to make pleas to the Crown to defend his own personal privileges and his family's. He moved to Segovia, where the court was located at the time, travelling by mule in early 1506. In March 1506, after the wedding of King Ferdinand and Germaine of Foix in Valladolid, Spain, Columbus followed in order to continue his pleas. On 20 May 1506, aged 54, Columbus died in Valladolid.

== Location of remains ==
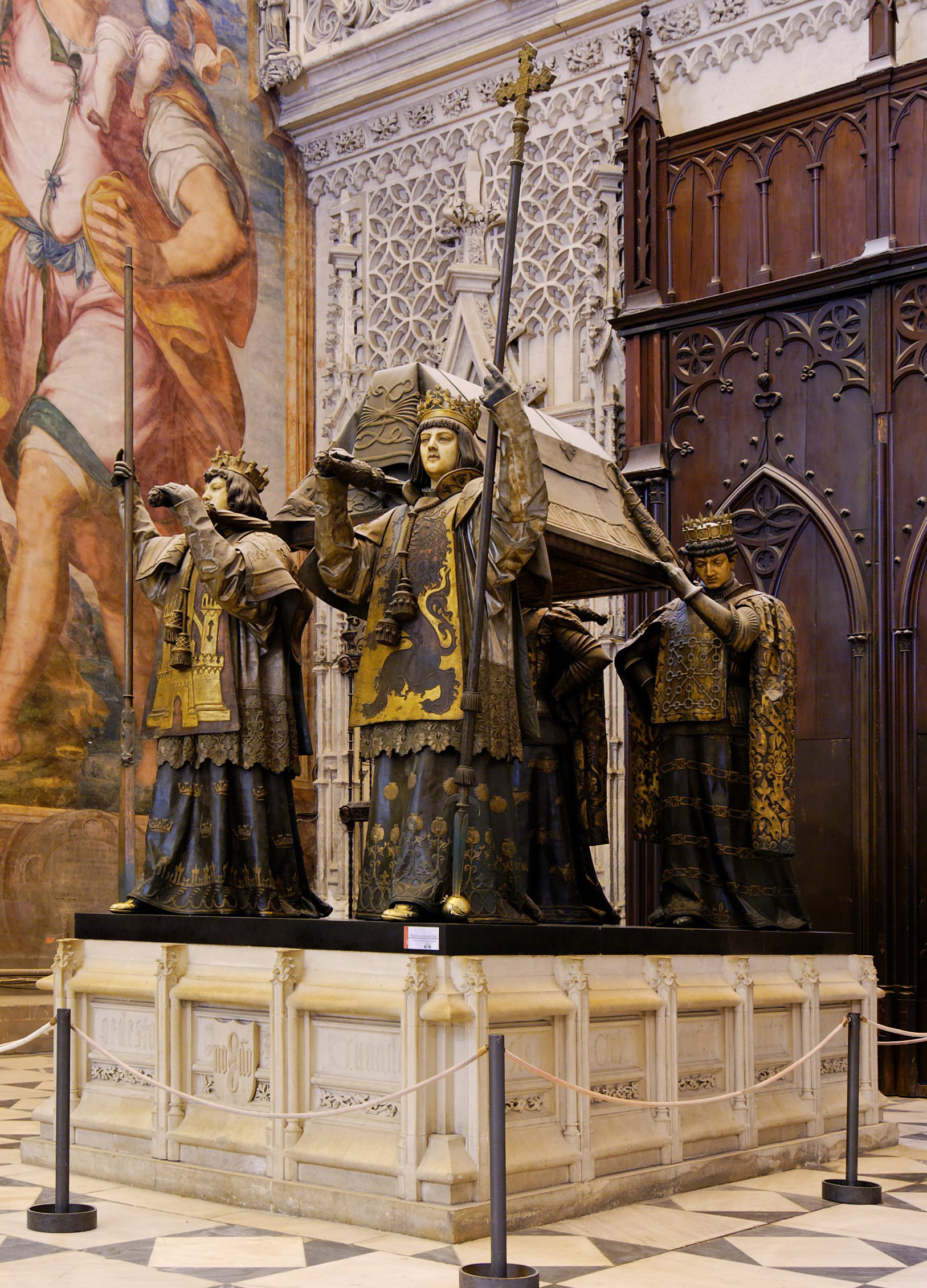
Tomb of Columbus in Seville Cathedral, Seville, Spain. The remains in the casket are borne by kings of Castile, Leon, Aragon, and Navarre.

Tomb in Columbus Lighthouse, Santo Domingo Este, Dominican Republic

Columbus's remains were first buried at the Chapel of Wonders at the Convent of St. Francis, Valladolid, but were then moved to the monastery of La Cartuja in Seville (southern Spain) by the will of his son Diego. They may have been exhumed in 1513 and interred at the Seville Cathedral. In about 1536, the remains of both Columbus and his son Diego were moved to a cathedral in Colonial Santo Domingo, in the present-day Dominican Republic; Columbus had requested to be buried on the island. By some accounts, in 1793, when France took over the entire island of Hispaniola, Columbus's remains were moved to Havana, Cuba. (Note: Captain George Farquar of Lord Stanley brought the news to Liverpool in 1796 that while he had been at Havana, the Spanish ship of the line San Lorenzo had arrived there carrying the "coffin, bones and fetters of Christopher Columbus" from San Domingo to be re-interred at Havana with "the highest military honours.") After Cuba became independent following the Spanish–American War in 1898, at least some of these remains were moved back to the Seville Cathedral, where they were placed on an elaborate catafalque.

In June 2003, DNA samples were taken from the remains in Seville, as well as those of Columbus's brother Diego and younger son Fernando. Initial observations suggested that the bones did not appear to match Columbus's physique or age at death. DNA extraction proved difficult; only short fragments of mitochondrial DNA could be isolated. These matched corresponding DNA from Columbus's brother, supporting that the two men had the same mother. Such evidence, together with anthropologic and historic analyses, led the researchers to conclude that the remains belonged to Christopher Columbus. (Note: DNA from Columbus's presumed remains in Seville were to be used to conduct further ancestral studies, with results initially expected in 2021.)

In 1877, a priest discovered a lead box at Santo Domingo inscribed: "Discoverer of America, First Admiral". Inscriptions found the next year read "Last of the remains of the first admiral, Sire Christopher Columbus, discoverer." The box contained bones of an arm and a leg, as well as a bullet. (Note: This same year, dust collected from these remains was placed in a locket, which was placed inside the stern of a silver model caravel. Two tiny portions of dust from the same source were placed in separate vials.) These remains were considered legitimate by physician and U.S. Assistant Secretary of State John Eugene Osborne, who suggested in 1913 that they travel through the Panama Canal as a part of its opening ceremony. (Note: Osborne erroneously cited the bullet as evidence that the remains belonged to Columbus. (England's Francis Drake, a subsequent infamous explorer, took the ball of an arquebus in the Indies.)) These remains were kept at the Basilica Cathedral of Santa María la Menor (in the Colonial City of Santo Domingo) before being moved to the Columbus Lighthouse (Santo Domingo Este, inaugurated in 1992). The authorities in Santo Domingo have never allowed these remains to be DNA-tested, so it is unconfirmed whether they are from Columbus's body as well. (Note: In his 2008 book, author Tony Horwitz recounts his attempt to see these remains, which are apparently briefly displayed in their crypt (behind a sheet of glass) once a year on Columbus Day.)

== Commemoration ==
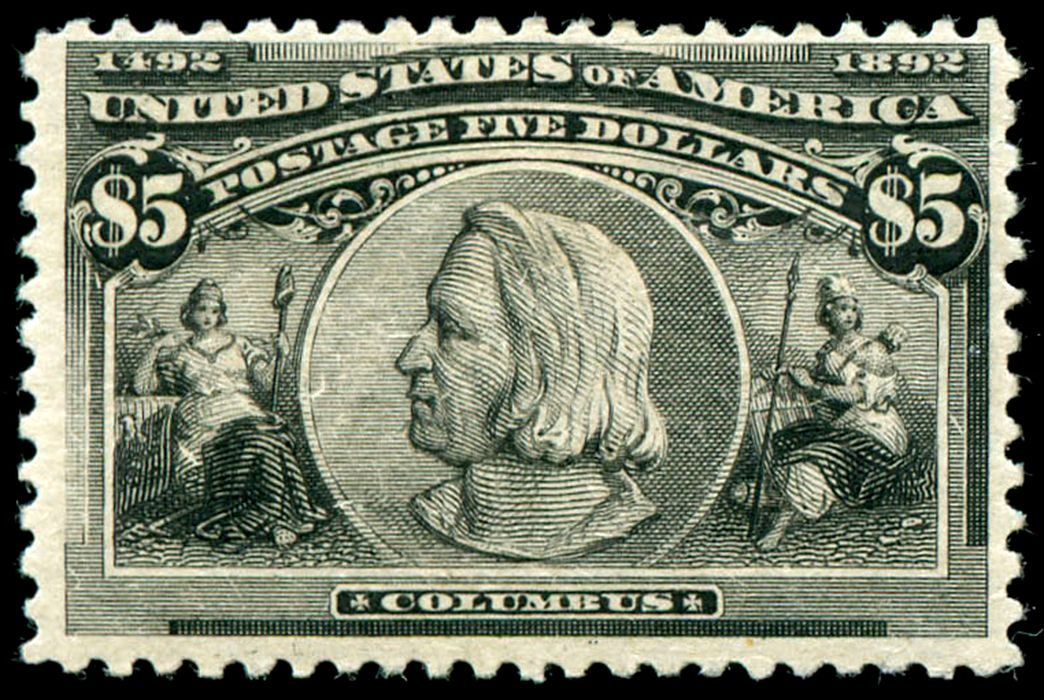
U.S. Columbian Issue of 1893.

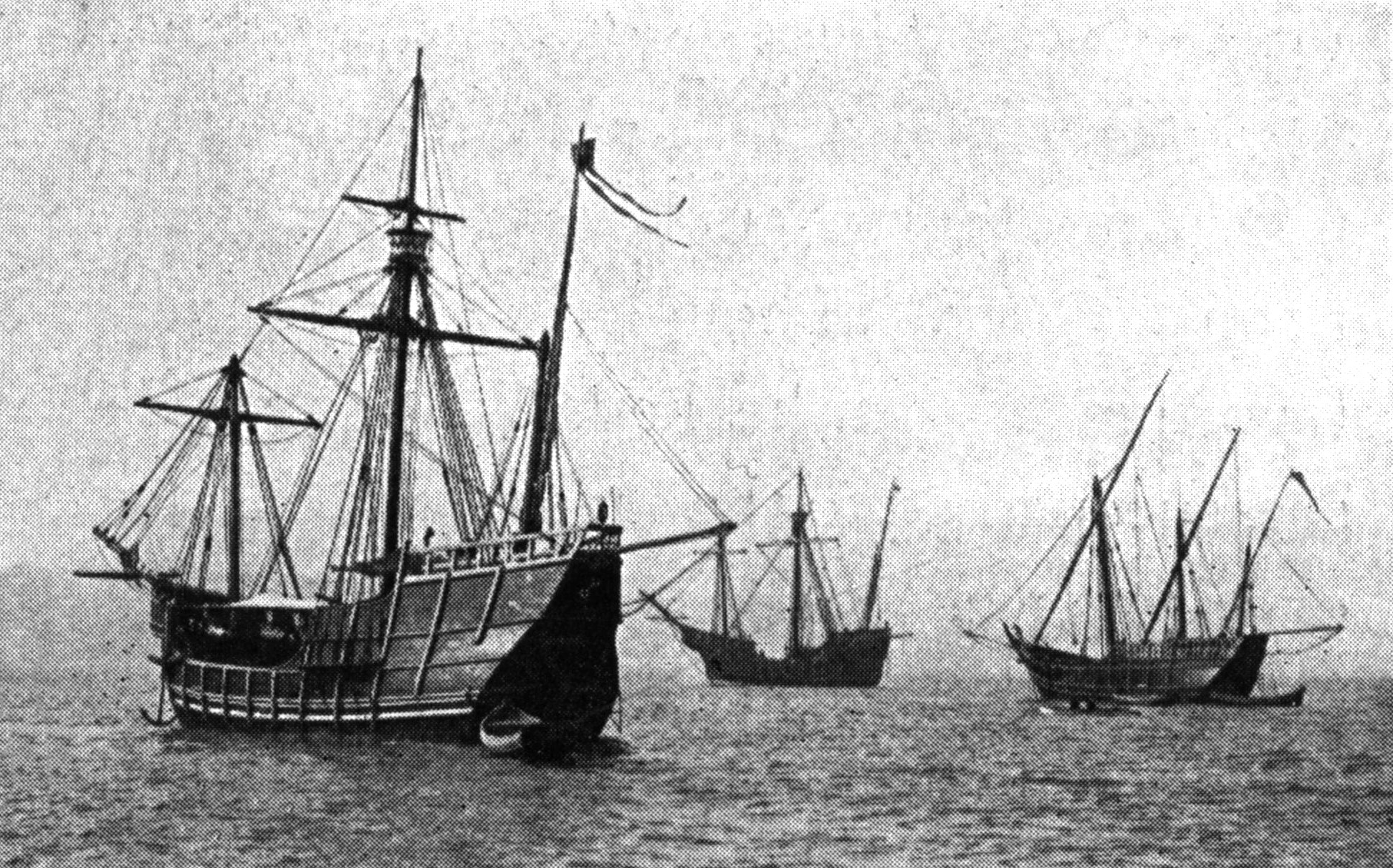
Replicas of the Niña, Pinta and Santa María sailed from Spain to the Chicago Columbian Exposition in 1893

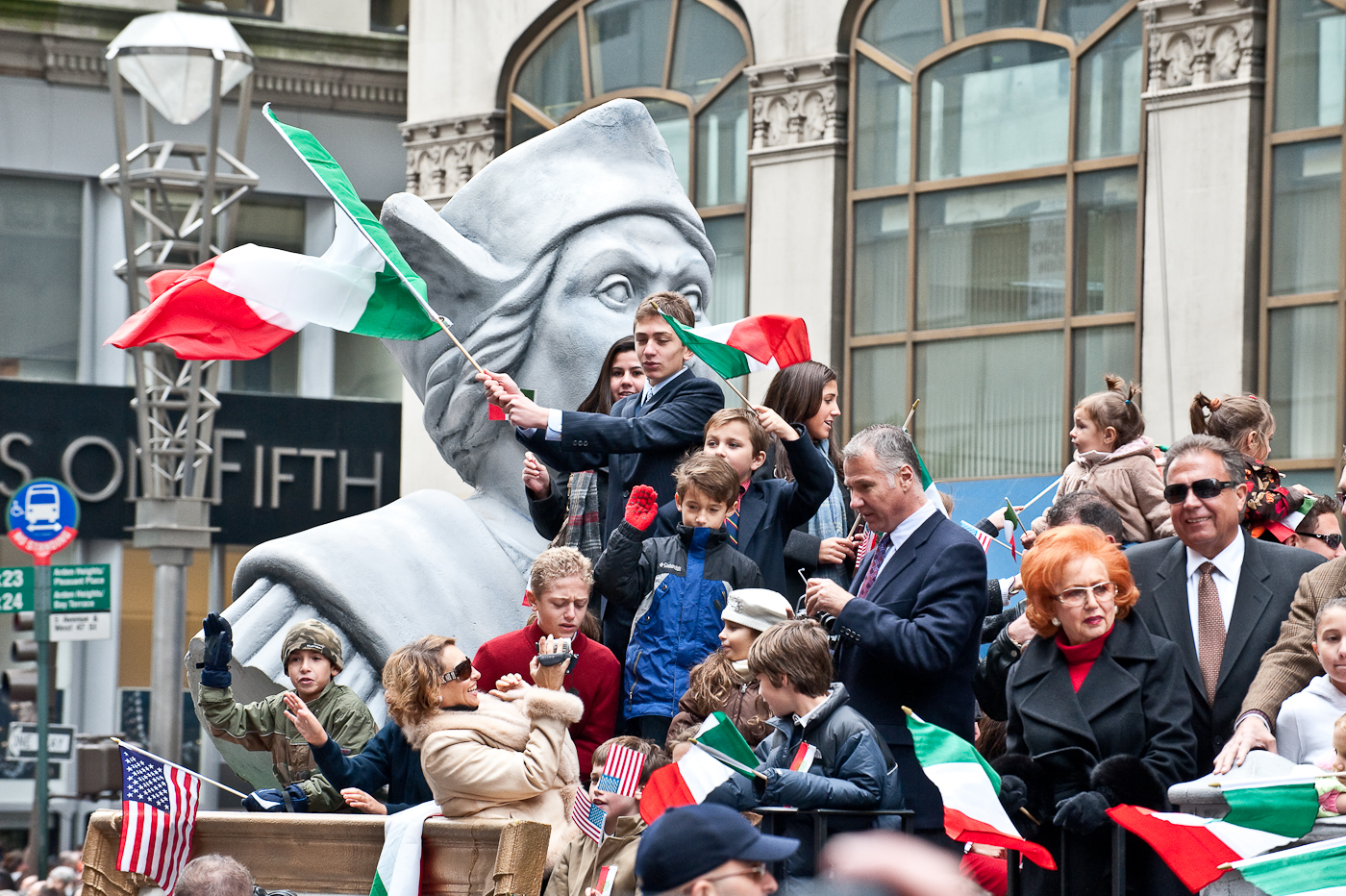
Columbus Day parade celebration in New York City, U.S.

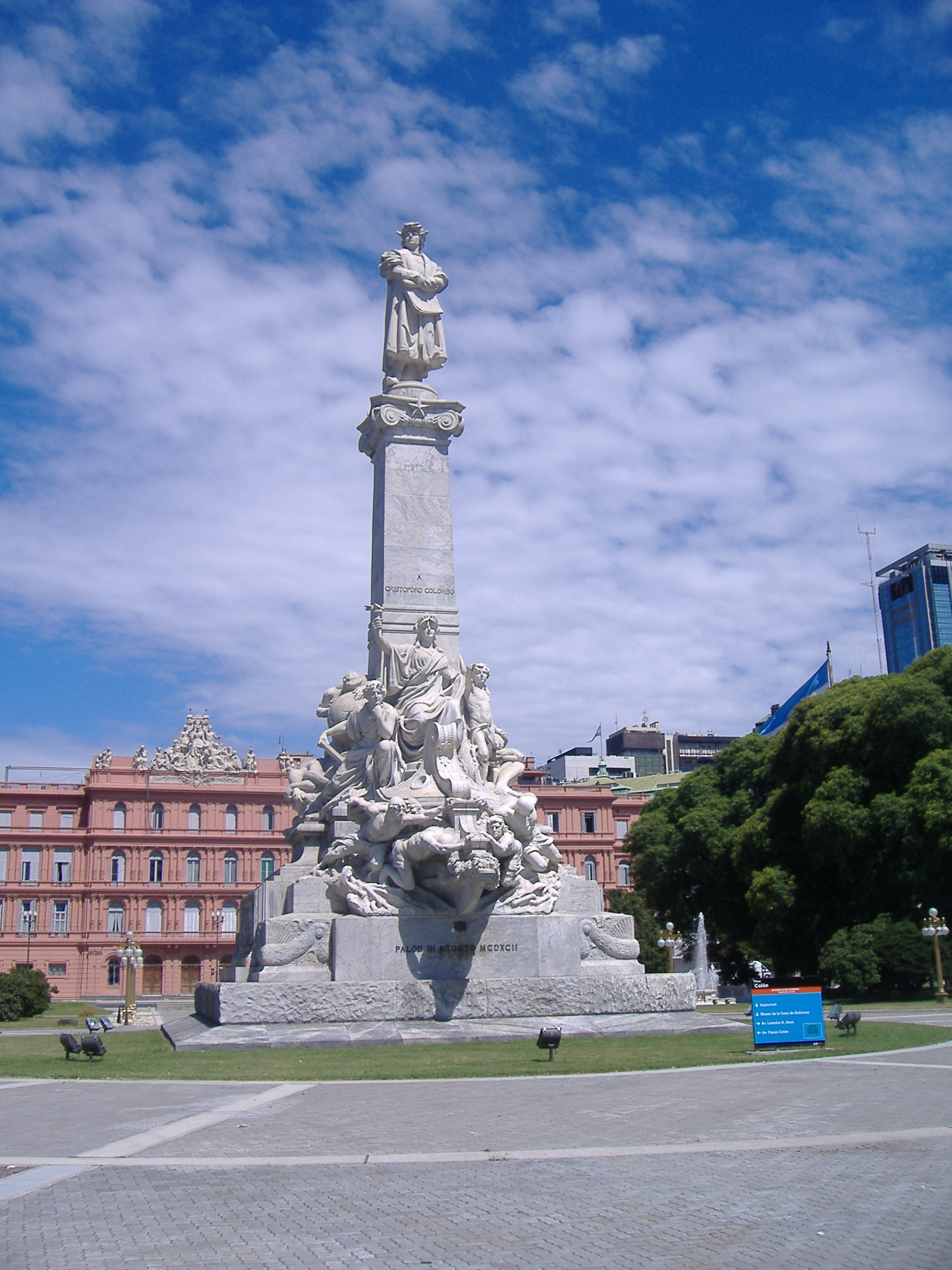
Monument to Christopher Columbus in Buenos Aires, Argentina

The figure of Columbus was admired in the British colonies in North America during the colonial era: Columbus became a unifying symbol in history of the British Thirteen Colonies that became the United States when Puritan preachers began to use his life story as a model for a "developing American spirit". In the spring of 1692, Puritan preacher Cotton Mather described Columbus's voyage as one of three shaping events of the modern age, connecting Columbus's voyage and the Puritans' migration to North America, seeing them together as the key to a grand design.

The use of Columbus as a founding figure of New World nations spread rapidly after the American Revolution. This was out of a desire to develop a national history and founding myth with fewer ties to Britain and other European Powers. His name was the underlying basis for the female national personification of the United States, Columbia, which also was in use since the 1730s with reference to the original British Thirteen Colonies, and also a historical name applied to the Americas and to the New World. Columbia, South Carolina, and Columbia Rediviva, the ship for which the Columbia River was named, are named for Columbus.

Columbus's name was given to the newly born Republic of Colombia in the early 19th century, inspired by the political project of "Colombeia" developed by the Venezuelan revolutionary Francisco de Miranda, which was put at the service of the emancipation of continental Hispanic America.

To commemorate the 400th anniversary of the landing of Columbus, the 1893 World's Fair in Chicago was named the World's Columbian Exposition. The U.S. Postal Service issued the first U.S. commemorative stamps, the Columbian Issue, depicting Columbus, Queen Isabella, and others in various stages of his several voyages. A commemorative silver half dollar was also struck, which remains the only U.S. currency issued having a foreigner as its subject. The policies related to the celebration of the Spanish colonial empire as the vehicle of a nationalist project undertaken in Spain during the Restoration in the late 19th century took form with the commemoration of the 4th centenary on 12 October 1892 (in which the figure of Columbus was extolled by the Conservative government), eventually becoming the very same national day. Several monuments commemorating the "discovery" were erected in cities such as Palos, Barcelona, Granada, Madrid, Salamanca, Valladolid, and Seville in the years around the 400th anniversary. (Note: See: Columbus Monument, Barcelona (1888), Monument to the Discoverers (1892), Monument to Columbus (Madrid) (1892), Monument to Isabella the Catholic (Granada) (1892), Monument to Columbus (Salamanca) (1893), Monument to Columbus (Valladolid) (inaugurated in 1905, but whose inception dates to an earlier date and a tentative location in Spanish Havana).)

For the Columbus Quincentenary in 1992, a second Columbian issue was released jointly with Italy, Portugal, and Spain. Columbus was celebrated at Seville Expo '92, and Genoa Expo '92.

The Boal Mansion Museum, founded in 1951, contains a collection of materials concerning later descendants of Columbus and collateral branches of the family. It features a 16th-century chapel from a Spanish castle reputedly owned by Diego Colón which became the residence of Columbus's descendants. The chapel interior was dismantled and moved from Spain in 1909 and re-erected on the Boal estate in Boalsburg, Pennsylvania. Inside it are numerous religious paintings and other objects including a reliquary with fragments of wood supposedly from the True Cross. The museum also holds a collection of documents mostly relating to Columbus descendants of the late 18th and early 19th centuries.

In many countries of the Americas, as well as Spain and Italy, Columbus Day celebrates the anniversary of Columbus's arrival in the Americas on 12 October 1492.

== Legacy ==
The voyages of Columbus are considered a turning point in human history, marking the beginning of globalization and accompanying demographic, commercial, economic, social, and political changes.

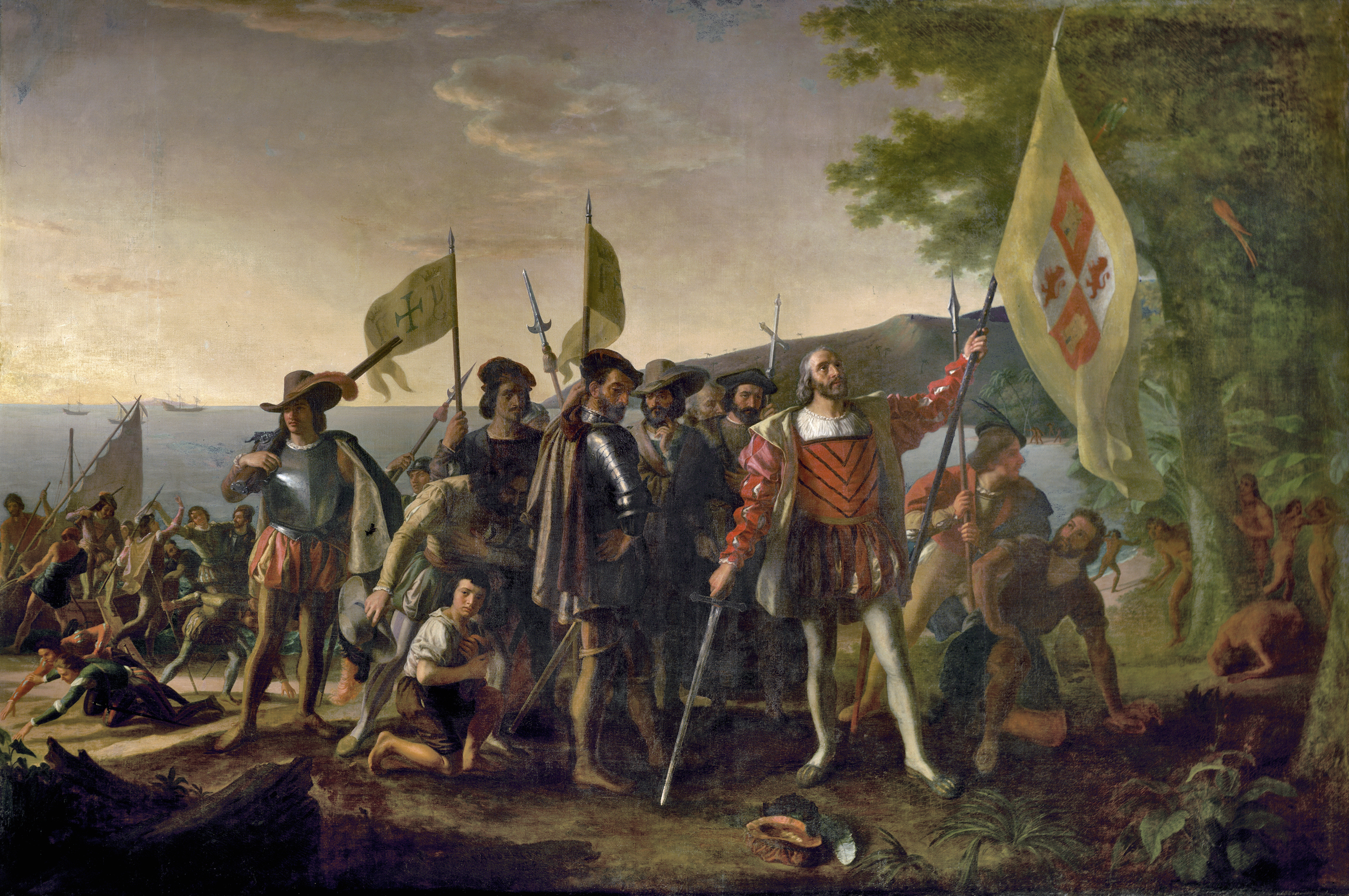
Landing of Columbus by John Vanderlyn, 1847. The landing of Columbus became a powerful icon of American genesis in the 19th century.

His explorations resulted in permanent contact between the two hemispheres, and the term "pre-Columbian" is used to refer to the indigenous cultures before the arrival of Columbus and successive European explorers. The ensuing Columbian exchange saw the massive exchange of people, animals, cultures, plants, fungi, diseases, technologies, mineral wealth, and ideas.

In the first century after his endeavors, Columbus's figure largely languished in the backwaters of history, and his reputation was beset by his failures as a colonial administrator. His legacy was somewhat rescued from oblivion when he began to appear as a character in Italian and Spanish plays and poems from the late 16th century onward.

Columbus was subsumed into the Western World's narrative of colonization and empire building, which invoked notions of translatio imperii and translatio studii to underline who was considered "civilized" and who was not.

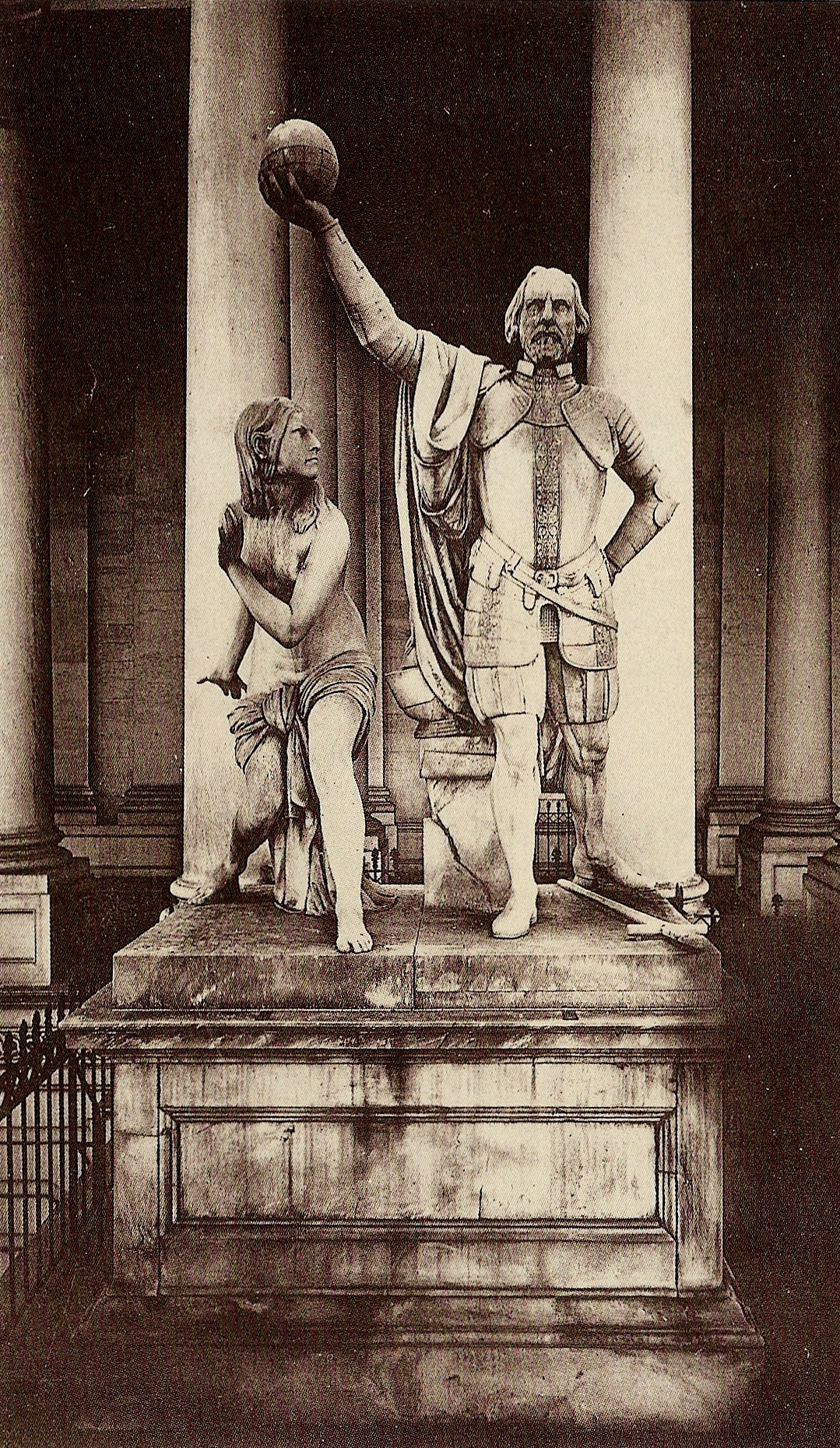
The Discovery of America sculpture, depicting Columbus and a cowering Indian maiden, stood outside the U.S. Capitol from 1844 to 1958.

The Americanization of the figure of Columbus began in the latter decades of the 18th century, after the revolutionary period of the United States, elevating the status of his reputation to a national myth, homo americanus. His landing became a powerful icon as an "image of American genesis". The Discovery of America sculpture, depicting Columbus and a cowering Indian maiden, was commissioned on 3 April 1837, when U.S. president Martin Van Buren sanctioned the engineering of Luigi Persico's design. This representation of Columbus's triumph and the American Indian's recoil is a demonstration of supposed white superiority over the savage, naïve natives. As recorded during its unveiling in 1844, the sculpture extends to "represent the meeting of the two races", as Persico captures their first interaction, highlighting the "moral and intellectual inferiority" of American Indians. Placed outside the U.S. Capitol building where it remained until its removal in the mid-20th century, the sculpture reflected the contemporary view of whites in the U.S. toward the American Indians; they are labeled as "merciless Indian savages" in the United States Declaration of Independence. In 1836, Pennsylvania senator and future U.S. President James Buchanan, who proposed the sculpture, described it as representing "the great discoverer when he first bounded with ecstasy upon the shore, all his toils past, presenting a hemisphere to the astonished world, with the name America inscribed upon it. Whilst he is thus standing upon the shore, a female savage, with awe and wonder depicted in her countenance, is gazing upon him."

The American Columbus myth was reconfigured later in the century when he was enlisted as an ethnic hero by immigrants to the United States who were not of Anglo-Saxon stock, such as Jewish, Italian, and Irish people, who claimed Columbus as a sort of ethnic founding father. Catholics unsuccessfully tried to promote him for canonization in the 19th century.

From the 1990s onward, a narrative of Columbus being responsible for the genocide of indigenous peoples and environmental destruction began to compete with the then predominant discourse of Columbus as Christ-bearer, scientist, or father of America. Exposed to Old World diseases, the indigenous populations of the New World collapsed, and were largely replaced by Europeans in particular and Black Africans, who brought with them new methods of farming, business, governance, and religious worship.

=== Originality of discovery of America ===
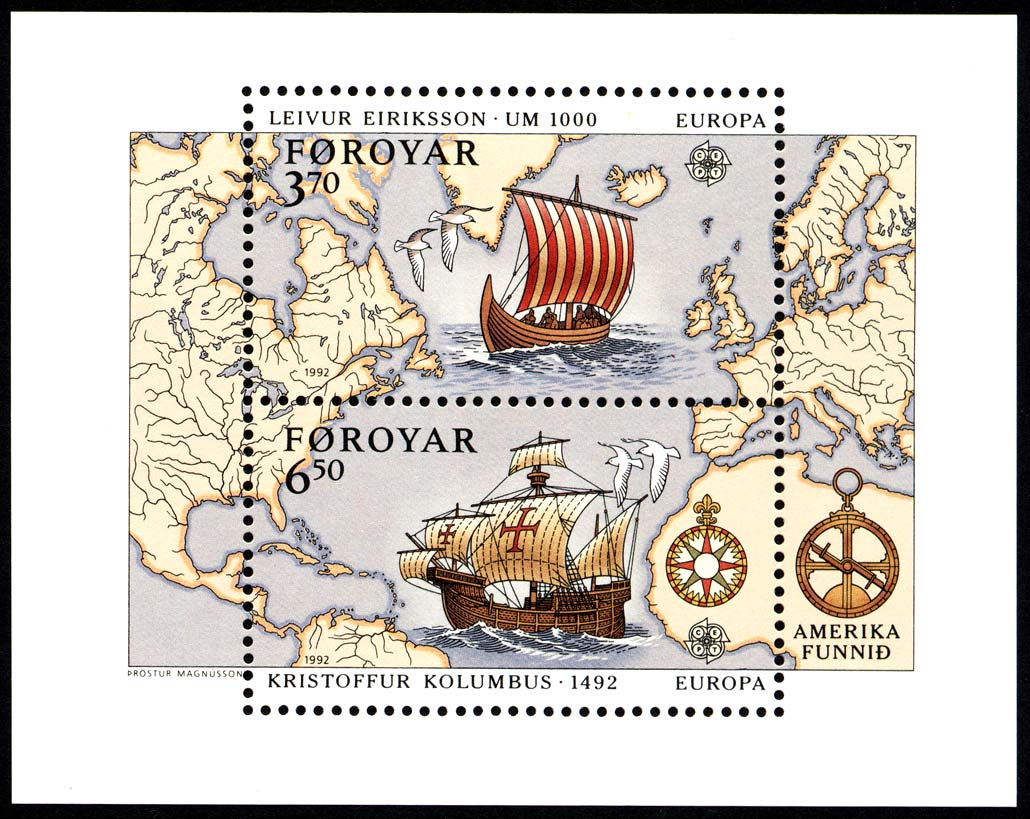
Discovery of America, a postage stamp from the Faroe Islands commemorates the voyages of discovery of Leif Erikson (c. 1000) and Christopher Columbus (1492).

Though Christopher Columbus came to be considered the European discoverer of America in Western popular culture, his historical legacy is more nuanced. After settling Iceland, the Norse settled the uninhabited southern part of Greenland beginning in the 10th century. Norsemen are believed to have then set sail from Greenland and Iceland to become the first known Europeans to reach the North American mainland, nearly 500 years before Columbus reached the Caribbean. The 1960s discovery of a Norse settlement dating c. 1000 at L'Anse aux Meadows, Newfoundland, partially corroborates accounts within the Icelandic sagas of Erik the Red's colonization of Greenland and his son Leif Erikson's subsequent exploration of a place he called Vinland.

In the 19th century, amid a revival of interest in Norse culture, Carl Christian Rafn and Benjamin Franklin DeCosta wrote works establishing that the Norse had preceded Columbus in colonizing the Americas. Following this, in 1874 Rasmus Bjørn Anderson argued that Columbus must have known of the North American continent before he started his voyage of discovery. Most modern scholars doubt Columbus had knowledge of the Norse settlements in America, with his arrival to the continent being most likely an independent discovery.

Europeans devised explanations for the origins of the native populations and their geographical distribution with narratives that often served to reinforce their own preconceptions built on ancient intellectual foundations. In modern Latin America, the non-Native populations of some countries often demonstrate an ambiguous attitude toward the perspectives of Native populations regarding first contact with Europeans and the era of colonialism that followed. In his 1960 monograph, Mexican historian Edmundo O'Gorman explicitly rejects the Columbus discovery myth, arguing that the idea that Columbus discovered America was a misleading legend fixed in the public mind through the works of American author Washington Irving during the 19th century. O'Gorman argues that to assert Columbus "discovered America" is to shape the facts concerning the events of 1492 to make them conform to an interpretation that arose many years later. For him, the Eurocentric view of the discovery of America sustains systems of domination in ways that favor Europeans. In a 1992 article for The UNESCO Courier, Félix Fernández-Shaw argues that the word "discovery" prioritizes European explorers as the "heroes" of the contact between the Old and New World. He suggests that the word "encounter" is more appropriate, giving emphasis to all parties who encountered each other.

=== America as a distinct land ===
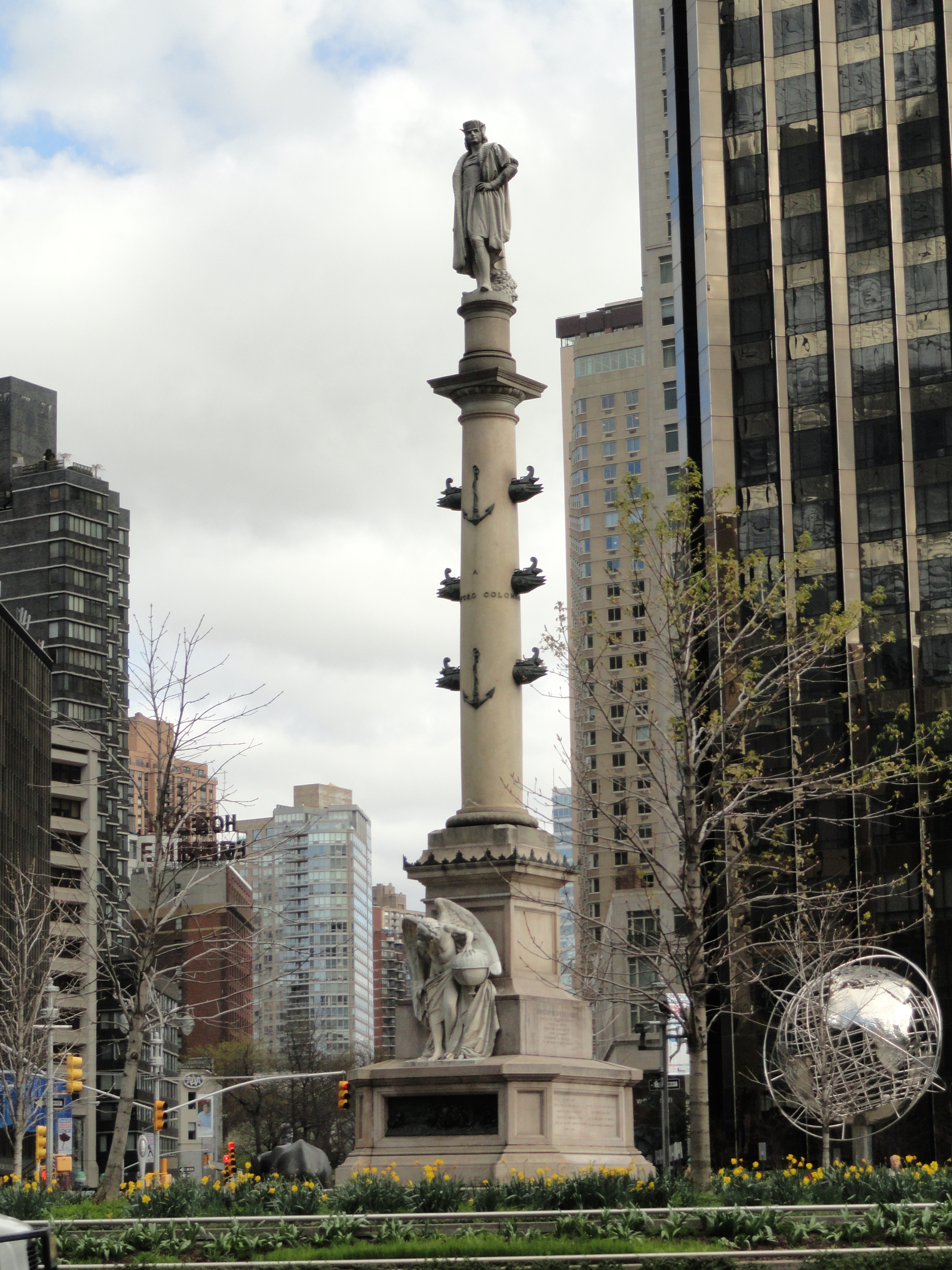
The Columbus Monument in Columbus Circle, New York City

Historians have traditionally argued that Columbus remained convinced until his death that his journeys had been along the east coast of Asia as he originally intended (excluding arguments such as Anderson's). On his third voyage he briefly referred to South America as a "hitherto unknown" continent, while also rationalizing that it was the Earthly Paradise (Eden) located "at the end of the Orient". Columbus continued to claim in his later writings that he had reached Asia; in a 1502 letter to Pope Alexander VI, he asserts that Cuba is the east coast of Asia. On the other hand, in a document in the Book of Privileges (1502), Columbus refers to the New World as the Indias Occidentales ('West Indies'), which he says "were unknown to all the world".

=== Shape of the Earth ===
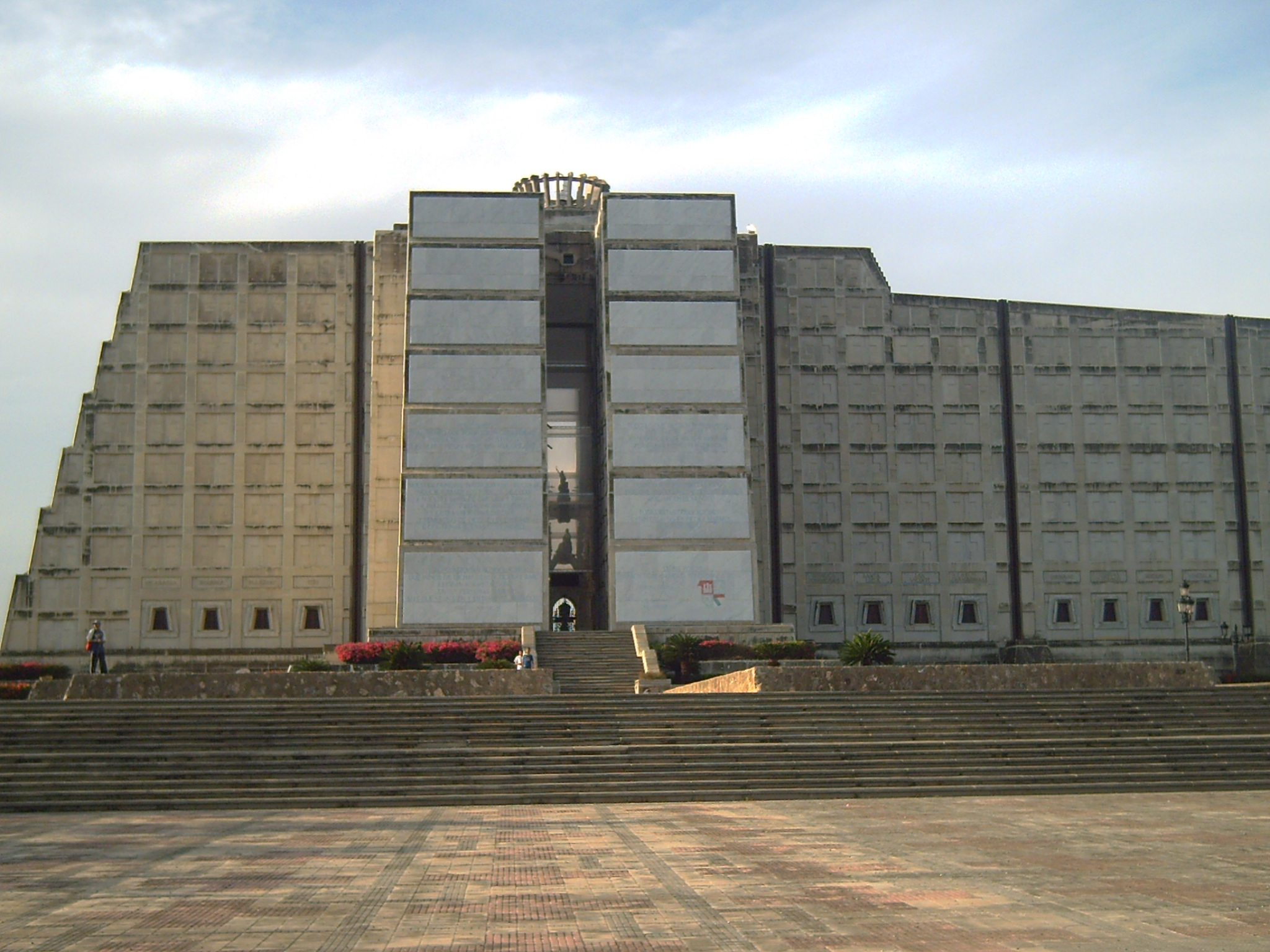
Columbus Lighthouse, a Museum and Mausoleum in homage to Christopher Columbus in Santo Domingo, Dominican Republic

Washington Irving's 1828 biography of Columbus popularized the idea that Columbus had difficulty obtaining support for his plan because many Catholic theologians insisted that the Earth was flat, but this is a popular misconception which can be traced back to 17th-century Protestants campaigning against Catholicism. In fact, the spherical shape of the Earth had been known to scholars since antiquity, and was common knowledge among sailors, including Columbus. Coincidentally, the oldest surviving globe of the Earth, the Erdapfel, was made in 1492, just before Columbus's return to Europe from his first voyage. As such it contains no sign of the Americas and yet demonstrates the common belief in a spherical Earth.

In 1492, Columbus correctly measured Polaris's diurnal motion around true north as having a diameter of almost 7°. In 1498, while sailing west through the doldrums 8° north in July and again in August sailing the trade winds 13° north, Columbus reported seeing Polaris with a diurnal motion of 10° in diameter. He accounted for the shift by concluding that Earth's figure is pear-shaped, with the 'stalk' portion (comparing this to a woman's breast) being nearest Heaven and upon which was centered the Earthly Paradise. Although Columbus's later readings were incorrect, 20th-century satellite data happens to indicate that the Earth has a slight pear shape.

=== Criticism and defense ===
Columbus has been criticized both for his brutality and for initiating the depopulation of the natives of the Caribbean, whether by imported diseases or intentional violence. According to scholars of American Indian history, George Tinker and Mark Freedman, Columbus was responsible for creating a cycle of "murder, violence, and slavery" to maximize exploitation of the Caribbean islands' resources, and that native deaths on the scale at which they occurred would not have been caused by new diseases alone. Further, they describe the proposition that disease and not genocide caused these deaths as "American holocaust denial". Historian Kris Lane disputes whether it is appropriate to use the term "genocide" when the atrocities were not Columbus's intent, but resulted from his decrees, family business goals, and negligence. Other scholars defend Columbus's actions or allege that the worst accusations against him are not based in fact while others claim that "he has been blamed for events far beyond his own reach or knowledge".

As a result of the protests and riots that followed the murder of George Floyd in 2020, many public monuments of Christopher Columbus had been removed, with later some eventually repaired and/or restored.

==== Brutality ====
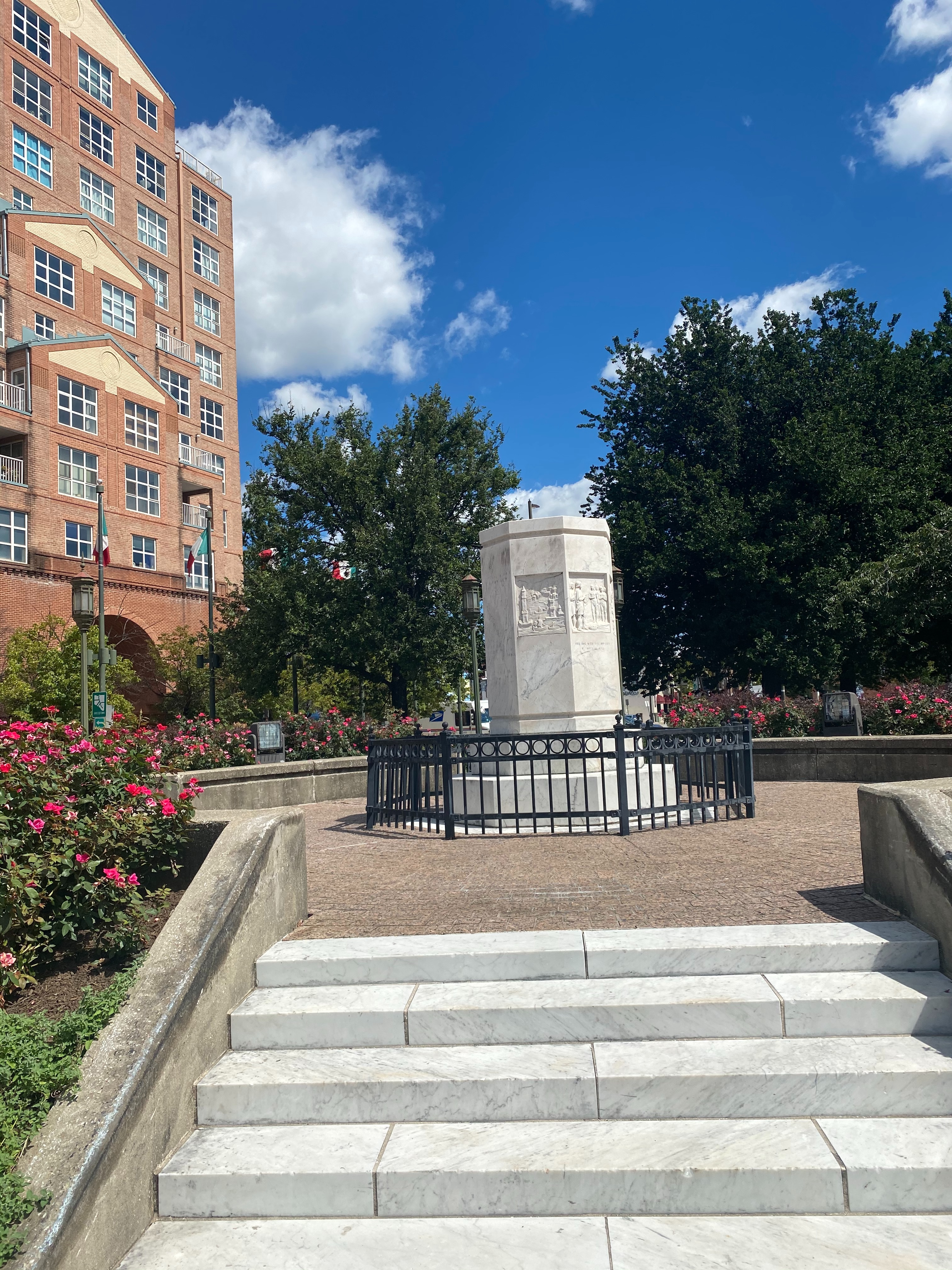
The remains of the pedestal base of the Columbus statue near Baltimore's Inner Harbor. The statue was thrown into the harbor on 4 July 2020, during the George Floyd protests in the city.

Some historians have criticized Columbus for initiating the widespread colonization of the Americas and for abusing its indigenous population. On St. Croix, Columbus's friend Michele da Cuneo—according to his own account—kept a native woman he captured, whom Columbus "gave to [him]", then brutally raped her. (Note: Cuneo wrote, While I was in the boat, I captured a very beautiful Carib woman, whom the said Lord Admiral gave to me. When I had taken her to my cabin she was naked—as was their custom. I was filled with a desire to take my pleasure with her and attempted to satisfy my desire. She was unwilling, and so treated me with her nails that I wished I had never begun. But—to cut a long story short—I then took a piece of rope and whipped her soundly, and she let forth such incredible screams that you would not have believed your ears. Eventually we came to such terms, I assure you, that you would have thought that she had been brought up in a school for whores.) (Note: Author Tony Horwitz notes that this is the first recorded instance of sexuality between a European and a Native American.)

According to some historians, the punishment for an indigenous person, aged 14 and older, failing to pay a hawk's bell, or cascabela, worth of gold dust every six months (based on Bartolomé de las Casas's account) was cutting off the hands of those without tokens, often leaving them to bleed to death. Other historians dispute such accounts. For example, a study of Spanish archival sources showed that the cascabela quotas were imposed by Guarionex, not Columbus, and that there is no mention, in the primary sources, of punishment by cutting off hands for failing to pay. Columbus had an economic interest in the enslavement of the Hispaniola natives and for that reason was not eager to baptize them, which attracted criticism from some churchmen. Consuelo Varela, a Spanish historian, stated that "Columbus's government was characterized by a form of tyranny. Even those who loved him had to admit the atrocities that had taken place." Other historians have argued that some of the accounts of the brutality of Columbus and his brothers have been exaggerated as part of the Black Legend, a historical tendency towards anti-Spanish and anti-Catholic sentiment in historical sources dating as far back as the 16th century, which they speculate may continue to taint scholarship into the present day.

According to historian Emily Berquist Soule, the immense Portuguese profits from the maritime trade in enslaved Africans along the West African coast served as an inspiration for Columbus to create a counterpart of this apparatus in the New World using its natives as slaves. Historian William J. Connell has argued that while Columbus "brought the entrepreneurial form of slavery to the New World", this "was a phenomenon of the times", further arguing that "we have to be very careful about applying 20th-century understandings of morality to the morality of the 15th century." In a less popular defense of colonization, Spanish ambassador María Jesús Figa has argued, "Normally we melded with the cultures in America, we stayed there, we spread our language and culture and religion."

British historian Basil Davidson has dubbed Columbus the "father of the slave trade", citing the fact that the first license to ship enslaved Black Africans to the Caribbean was issued by the Catholic Monarchs in 1501 to the first Spanish royal governor of Hispaniola, Nicolás de Ovando.

==== Genocide and depopulation ====
Around the turn of the 21st century, estimates for the pre-Columbian population of Hispaniola ranged between 250,000 and two million, (Note: Bartolomé de las Casas estimated that there were three to four million people indigenous to Hispaniola, and said 500,000 Lucayans were killed in the Bahamas. Most modern historians reject his figures.) but genetic analysis published in late 2020 suggests that smaller figures are more likely, perhaps as low as 10,000–50,000 for Hispaniola and Puerto Rico combined. Based on the previous figures of a few hundred thousand, some have estimated that a third or more of Haiti's inhabitants were dead within the first two years of Columbus's governorship. Contributors to depopulation included disease, warfare, and harsh enslavement. Indirect evidence suggests that some serious illness may have arrived with the 1,500 colonists who accompanied Columbus's second expedition in 1493. Charles C. Mann writes that "It was as if the suffering these diseases had caused in Eurasia over the past millennia were concentrated into the span of decades." A third of the natives forced to work in gold and silver mines died every six months. Within three to six decades, the surviving Arawak population numbered only in the hundreds. According to Koch et al, the indigenous populations of the Americas overall had declined by about 90% in the century after Columbus's arrival. Among Indigenous peoples, Columbus is often viewed as a key agent of genocide. Samuel Eliot Morison, a Harvard University historian and author of a multivolume biography on Columbus, writes, "The cruel policy initiated by Columbus and pursued by his successors resulted in complete genocide."

According to Noble David Cook, "There were too few Spaniards to have killed the millions who were reported to have died in the first century after Old and New World contact." He instead estimates that the death toll was caused by smallpox, which may have caused a pandemic only after the arrival of Hernán Cortés in 1519. According to some estimates, smallpox had an 80–90% fatality rate in Native American populations. They had no acquired immunity to these new diseases and suffered high fatalities. There is also evidence that they had poor diets and were overworked. Historian Andrés Reséndez of University of California, Davis, says the available evidence suggests "slavery has emerged as major killer" of the indigenous populations of the Caribbean between 1492 and 1550 more so than diseases such as smallpox, influenza and malaria. He says that indigenous populations did not experience a rebound like European populations did following the Black Death because unlike the latter, a large portion of the former were subjected to deadly forced labor in the mines.

The diseases that devastated the Native Americans came in multiple waves at different times, sometimes as much as centuries apart, which would mean that survivors of one disease may have been killed by others, preventing the population from recovering. Historian David Stannard describes the depopulation as "neither inadvertent nor inevitable", saying it was the result of both disease and intentional genocide.

==== Navigational expertise ====
Biographers and historians have a wide range of opinions about Columbus's expertise and experience navigating and captaining ships. One scholar lists some European works ranging from the 1890s to 1980s that support Columbus's experience and skill as among the best in Genoa, while listing some American works over a similar timeframe that portray the explorer as an untrained entrepreneur, having only minor crew or passenger experience prior to his noted journeys. According to Morison, Columbus's success in utilizing the trade winds might owe significantly to luck.

== Physical appearance ==
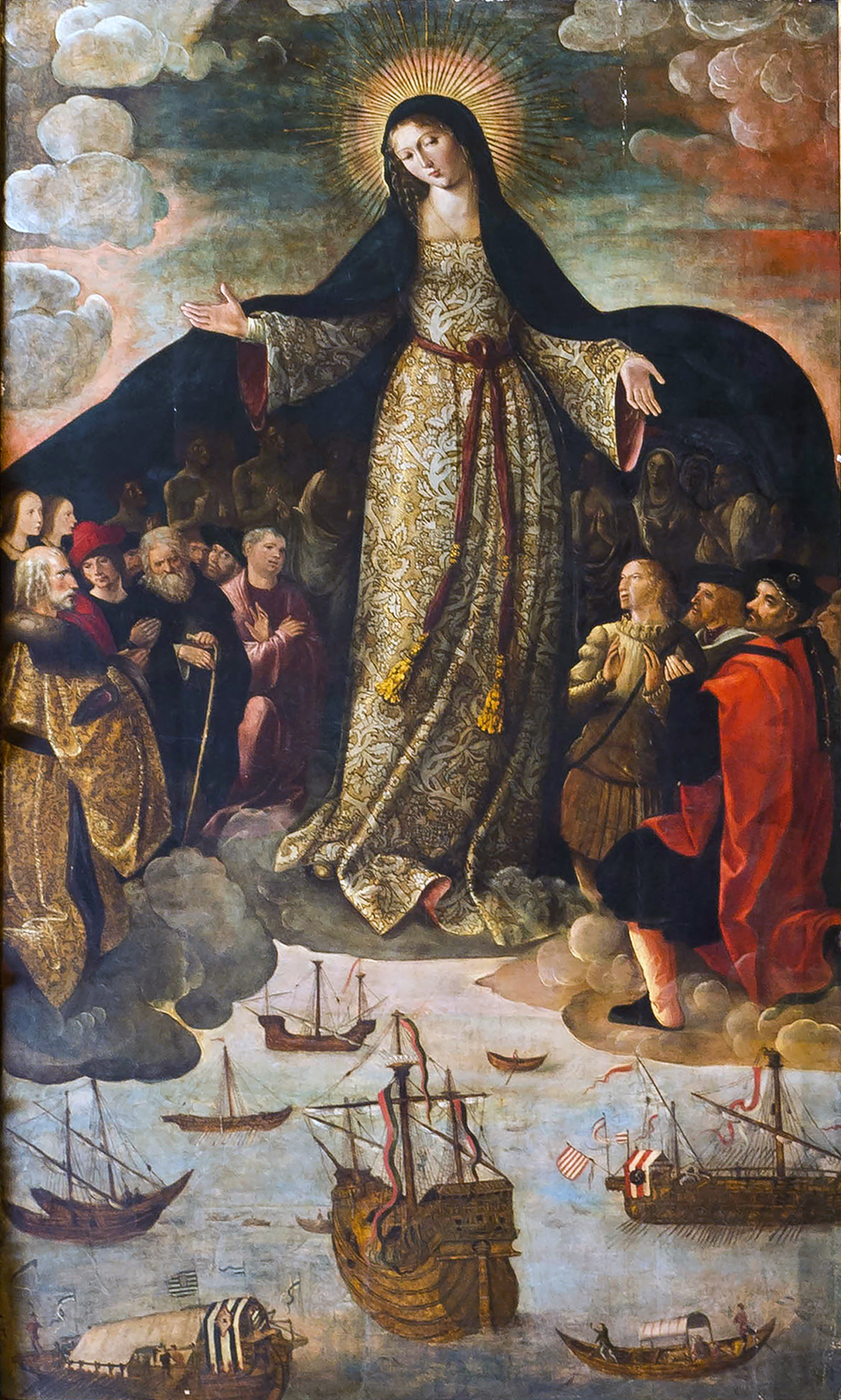
The Virgin of the Navigators by Alejo Fernández (1531–1536)

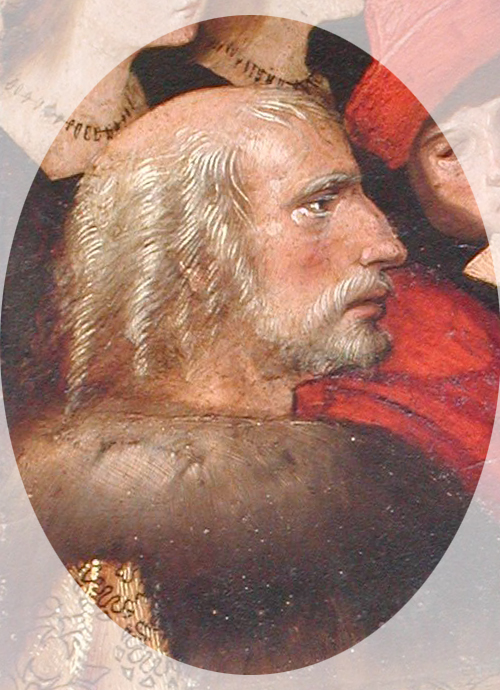
Close-up for Fernández's depiction of Columbus

Contemporary descriptions of Columbus, including those by his son Fernando and Bartolomé de las Casas, describe him as taller than average, with light skin (often sunburnt), blue or hazel eyes, high cheekbones and freckled face, an aquiline nose, and blond to reddish hair and beard (until about the age of 30, when it began to whiten). One Spanish commentator described his eyes using the word garzos, now usually translated as "light blue", but it seems to have indicated light grey-green or hazel eyes to Columbus's contemporaries. The word rubios can mean "blond", "fair", or "ruddy". Although an abundance of artwork depicts Columbus, no authentic contemporary portrait is known.

A well-known image of Columbus is a portrait by Sebastiano del Piombo, which has been reproduced in many textbooks. It agrees with descriptions of Columbus in that it shows a large man with auburn hair, but the painting dates from 1519 so cannot have been painted from life. Furthermore, the inscription identifying the subject as Columbus was probably added later, and the face shown differs from that of other images.

Sometime between 1531 and 1536, Alejo Fernández painted an altarpiece, The Virgin of the Navigators, that includes a depiction of Columbus. The painting was commissioned for a chapel in Seville's Casa de Contratación (House of Trade) in the Alcázar of Seville and remains there.

At the World's Columbian Exposition in 1893, 71 alleged portraits of Columbus were displayed; most of them did not match contemporary descriptions.

== See also ==
- Christopher Columbus House – Building in Genoa, Italy
- Christopher Columbus in fiction
- Voyages of Christopher Columbus
- Columbus Day – National holiday in the Americas, Italy, Spain and elsewhere
- Indigenous Peoples' Day – Counter-celebration held on the same day as Columbus Day in the U.S.
- Egg of Columbus – 16th-century anecdote about hindsight
- History of the Americas
- Lugares colombinos
- European colonization of the Americas - Colonization from Europe to the Americas
- Peopling of the Americas – Prehistoric migration from Asia to the Americas
- Indigenous response to colonialism
- Origin theories of Christopher Columbus
