= Voyages of Christopher Columbus =

1492–1504 voyages to the Americas

- Part of the Age of Discovery
- The four voyages of Columbus (conjectural)
- Date: First: 3 August 1492 – 4 March 1493; Second: 24 September 1493 – 11 June 1496; Third: 30 May 1498 – 23 August 1500; Fourth: 12 May 1502 – 7 November 1504
- Location: Americas
- Participants: Christopher Columbus and Castilian crew (among others)
- Outcome: European discovery and colonization of the Americas

Between 1492 and 1504, the Italian explorer and navigator Christopher Columbus led four transatlantic maritime expeditions to the Americas in the name of the Catholic Monarchs of Spain. These voyages led to Europeans learning about the New World and were an early breakthrough in the period known in Europe as the Age of Exploration, which saw the colonization of the Americas, a related biological exchange, and the beginning of trans-Atlantic trade. These events, the effects and consequences of which persist to the present, are often cited as the beginning of the modern era.

Born in the Republic of Genoa, Columbus was a navigator who sailed in search of a westward route to India, China, Japan and the Spice Islands thought to be the East Asian source of spices and other precious oriental goods that were otherwise obtainable only through arduous overland routes. Columbus was partly inspired by the 13th-century Italian explorer Marco Polo in his ambition to explore Asia. His initial belief that he had reached "the Indies" has resulted in the name "West Indies" being attached to the Bahamas and the other islands of the Caribbean.

At the time of Columbus's voyages, the Americas were inhabited by Indigenous Americans, and Columbus later participated in the beginning of the Spanish conquest of the Americas. Columbus died in 1506, and the next year, the New World was named "America" after the Italian explorer Amerigo Vespucci, who realized that it was a unique landmass. The search for a westward route to Asia was completed in 1521, when the Magellan expedition sailed across the Pacific Ocean and reached Southeast Asia, before returning to Europe and completing the first circumnavigation of the world.

== Background ==
Many Europeans of Columbus's day assumed that a single, uninterrupted ocean surrounded Europe, Asia and Africa, although Norse explorers had colonized areas of North America beginning with Greenland c. 986. The Norse maintained a presence in North America for hundreds of years, but contacts between their North American settlements and Europe had all but ceased by the early 15th century.

Until the mid-15th century, Europe enjoyed a safe land passage to China and India—sources of valued goods such as silk, spices, and opiates—under the hegemony of the Mongol Empire (the Pax Mongolica, or "Mongol Peace"). With the Fall of Constantinople to the Turkish Ottoman Empire in 1453, European countries sought to compete with the Silk Road dominated by the gunpowder empires through expanded use of ocean voyages to scope out and establish new trade routes.

Portugal was the main European power interested in pursuing trade routes overseas, with the neighboring kingdom of Castile — one of the predecessor kingdoms of present-day Spain — having been somewhat slower to begin exploring the Atlantic because of the land area it had to reconquer from the Moors during the Reconquista. This remained unchanged until the late 15th century, following the dynastic union by marriage of Queen Isabella I of Castile and King Ferdinand II of Aragon (together known as the Catholic Monarchs of Spain) in 1469, and the completion of the Reconquista in 1492, when the joint rulers conquered the Moorish kingdom of Granada, which had been providing Castile with African goods through tribute. The fledgling Spanish empire decided to fund Columbus's expedition in hopes of finding new trade routes and circumventing the lock Portugal had secured on Africa and the Indian Ocean with the 1481 papal bull Aeterni regis.

=== Navigation plans ===
In response to the need for a new route to Asia, by the 1480s, Christopher and his brother Bartholomew had developed a plan to travel to the Indies (then construed as roughly all of southern and eastern Asia) by sailing directly west across what was believed to be the singular "Ocean Sea", the Atlantic Ocean. By about 1481, Florentine cosmographer Paolo dal Pozzo Toscanelli sent Columbus a map depicting such a route, with no intermediary landmass other than the mythical island of Antillia. In 1484 on the island of La Gomera in the Canaries, then undergoing conquest by Castile, Columbus heard from some inhabitants of El Hierro that there was supposed to be a group of islands to the west.

A popular misconception that Columbus had difficulty obtaining support for his plan because Europeans thought the Earth was flat can be traced back to a 17th-century campaign of Protestants against Catholicism. This view was popularized in works such as Washington Irving's 1828 biography of Columbus. Knowledge that the Earth is spherical was actually widespread, having been the general opinion of ancient Greek science and gaining support throughout the Middle Ages (for example, Bede mentions it in The Reckoning of Time). The primitive maritime navigation of Columbus's time relied on regular observations of both the stars and the curvature of the Earth.

==== Diameter of Earth and travel distance estimates ====
Columbus's geographical conceptions (beige) compared to the known landmasses and their demarcation by Juan de la Cosa (black)

Eratosthenes (who assumed three variables he had not proved: the distance of the Sun, parallel light rays, and that the Earth was spherical) had measured the diameter of the Earth with good precision in the 2nd century BC, and the means of calculating its diameter using an astrolabe was known to both scholars and navigators. Where Columbus differed from the generally accepted view of his time was in his incorrect assumption of a significantly smaller diameter for the Earth, which led him to believe that Asia could be easily reached by sailing west across the Atlantic. Most scholars accepted Ptolemy's correct assessment that the terrestrial landmass (for Europeans of the time, comprising Eurasia and Africa) occupied 180 degrees of the terrestrial sphere, and dismissed Columbus's claim that the Earth was much smaller and that Asia was only a few thousand nautical miles to the west of Europe.

The "Columbus map", depicting only the Old World, was drawn c. 1490 in the workshop of Bartolomeo and Christopher Columbus in Lisbon.

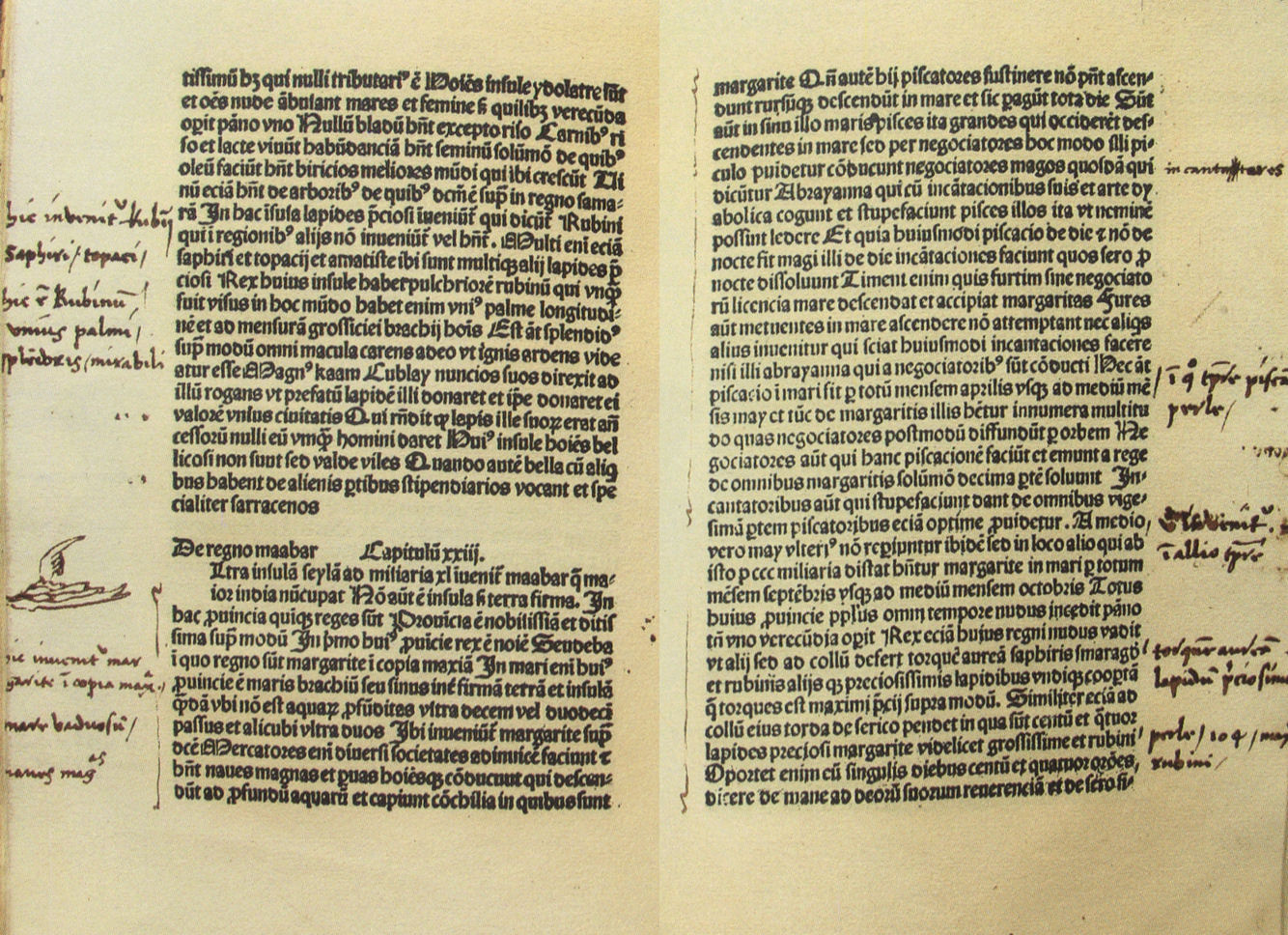
Handwritten notes by Christopher Columbus on the Latin edition of Marco Polo's Le livre des merveilles

Columbus believed the incorrect calculations of Marinus of Tyre, which had estimated the breadth of the Afro-Eurasian landmass at 225 degrees, leaving only 135 degrees of water. Moreover, Columbus underestimated Alfraganus's calculation of the length of a degree, reading the Arabic astronomer's writings as if, rather than using the Arabic mile (equivalent to about 1,830 meters), he had used the Italian mile (about 1,480 meters). Alfraganus had calculated the length of a degree to be 56 2/3 Arabic miles (66.2 nautical miles). Columbus therefore estimated the size of the Earth to be about 75% of Eratosthenes's calculation, and the distance from the Canary Islands westward to Japan as only 2,400 nautical miles (about 23% of the real figure).

==== Trade winds ====
There was a further element of key importance in the voyages of Columbus, the trade winds. He planned to first sail to the Canary Islands before continuing west by utilizing the northeast trade wind. Part of the return to Spain would require travelling against the wind using an arduous sailing technique called beating, during which almost no progress can be made. To effectively make the return voyage, Columbus would need to follow the curving trade winds northeastward to the middle latitudes of the North Atlantic, where he would be able to catch the "westerlies" that blow eastward to the coast of Western Europe.

This navigational technique for travel in the Atlantic appears to have been exploited first by the Portuguese, who referred to it as the volta do mar ("turn of the sea"). Columbus's knowledge of Atlantic wind patterns was, however, imperfect at the time of his first voyage. By sailing directly due west from the Canary Islands during hurricane season, skirting the so-called horse latitudes of the mid-Atlantic, Columbus risked either being becalmed or running into a tropical cyclone, both of which, by chance, he avoided.

=== Funding campaign ===
Around 1484, King John II of Portugal submitted Columbus's proposal to his experts, who rejected it on the basis that Columbus's estimation of a travel distance of 2,400 nautical miles was about four times too low (which was accurate).

In 1486, Columbus was granted an audience with the Catholic Monarchs, and he presented his plans to Queen Isabella. She referred these to a committee, which determined that Columbus had grossly underestimated the distance to Asia. Pronouncing the idea impractical, they advised the monarchs not to support the proposed venture. To keep Columbus from taking his ideas elsewhere, and perhaps to keep their options open, the Catholic Monarchs nonetheless gave him an allowance, totaling about 14,000 maravedís for the year, or about the annual salary of a sailor.

In 1488 Columbus again appealed to the court of Portugal, receiving a new invitation for an audience with John II. This again proved unsuccessful, in part because not long afterwards, Bartolomeu Dias returned to Portugal following a successful rounding of the southern tip of Africa. With an eastern sea route now under its control, Portugal was no longer interested in trailblazing a western trade route to Asia crossing unknown seas.

In May 1489, Isabella sent Columbus another 10,000 maravedís, and the same year the Catholic Monarchs furnished him with a letter ordering all cities and towns under their domain to provide him food and lodging at no cost.

As Queen Isabella's forces neared victory for Castile over the Moorish Emirate of Granada, Columbus was summoned to the Spanish court for renewed discussions. He waited at King Ferdinand's camp until January 1492, when the monarchs conquered Granada. A council led by Isabella's confessor, Hernando de Talavera, found Columbus's proposal to reach the Indies implausible. Columbus had left for France when Ferdinand intervened, (Note: Ferdinand later claimed credit for being "the principal cause why those islands were discovered.") first sending Talavera and Bishop Diego Deza to appeal to the queen. Isabella was finally convinced by the king's clerk Luis de Santángel, who argued that Columbus would bring his ideas elsewhere, and offered to help arrange the funding. (Note: Some have argued that Santángel, a Jew who had converted to Catholicism to avoid Spanish persecution, aimed to open a channel to a safer place for fellow Jews to reside.) Isabella then sent a royal guard to fetch Columbus, who had travelled several kilometers toward Córdoba.

In the April 1492 "Capitulations of Santa Fe", Columbus was promised he would be given the title "Admiral of the Ocean Sea" and appointed viceroy and governor of any land which was newly claimed and colonized for the Crown; he would also receive ten percent of all the revenues from the new lands in perpetuity if he was successful. He had the right to nominate three people, from whom the sovereigns would choose one, for any office in the new lands. The terms were unusually generous but, as his son later wrote, the monarchs were not confident of his return.

=== Capitulations and royal orders ===
==== Capitulations of Santa Fe ====
The capitulations were signed on 17 April 1492 in the town of Santa Fe, in the Province of Granada. The Capitulations of Santa Fe were the agreements that Christopher Columbus reached with the Catholic Monarchs in order to carry out the voyage. These granted him the lifelong and hereditary title of "Admiral of the Ocean Sea", the title of "Viceroy and Governor" of any lands he might discover in the name of the Kingdom, the right to receive one-tenth of the riches and merchandise, the authority to deal with disputes arising over wealth, and the right to contribute one-eighth of the expedition in exchange for obtaining one-eighth of the profits earned.

==== Royal provisions ordering caravels to be placed at Columbus's service ====
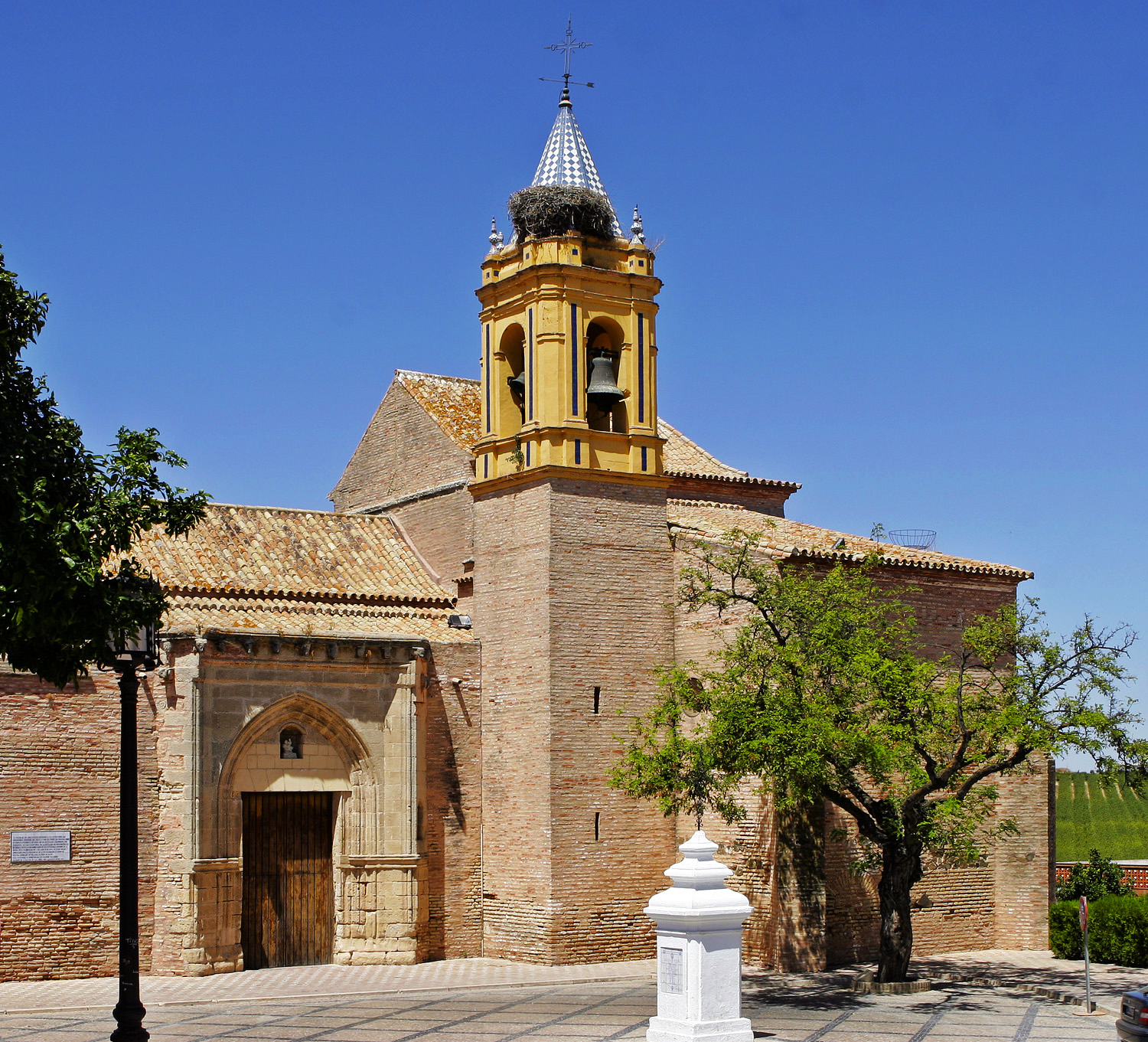
Church of Saint George the Martyr in Palos de la Frontera

Among the various royal provisions and charters granted to Columbus for the realization of his project, one was addressed to some of the residents of the town of Palos because of a sanction that had been imposed on them by the royal council. The royal provision was read on 23 May 1492, at the doors of the Church of Saint George in Palos de la Frontera, in the presence of Columbus, Friar Juan Pérez, and the local authorities. In that royal order, those residents were instructed to place at Columbus's disposal two caravels fully armed and fitted out.

Royal Provision of the Catholic Monarchs
Addressed to certain residents of Palos ordering them to deliver two caravels to Christopher Columbus
... You well know that, because of certain deeds done and committed by you in disservice to us, you were sentenced by members of our Council to be obliged to serve us for two months with two armed caravels, at your own cost and expense, whenever and wherever it should be commanded by us, under certain penalties, as is set out more fully in the said judgment that was given against you. And now, because we have ordered Christopher Columbus to go with three caravels as commander of the said three caravels to certain parts of the Ocean Sea on matters that concern our service, and we desire that he take with him the said two caravels with which you are thus bound to serve us...

— Granada, 30 April 1492.
Archive of the Indies. Shelfmark: PATRONATO, 295, N.3.

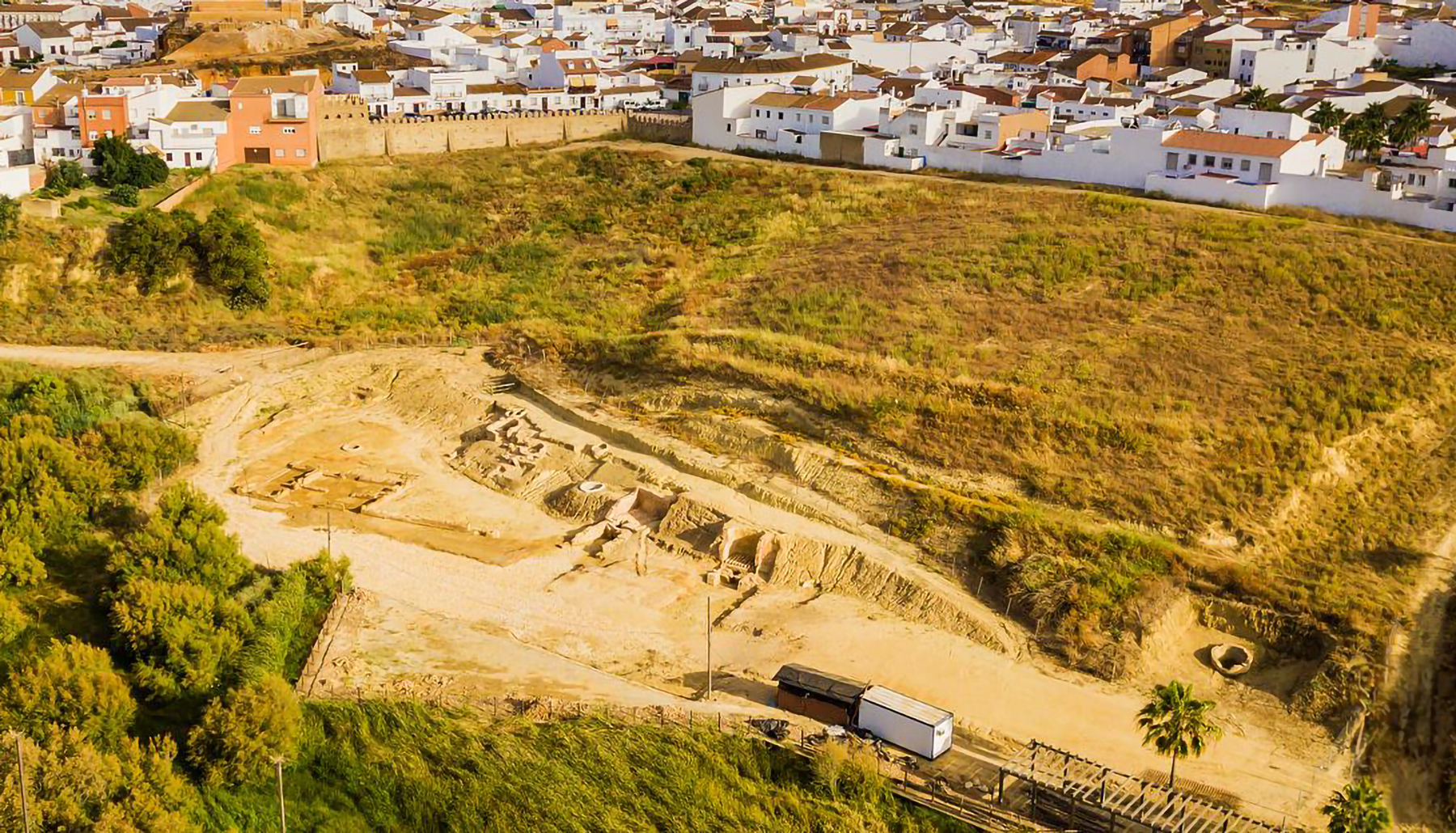
Archaeological remains of the historic Port of Palos de la Frontera, from where Columbus's first voyage departed

The residents to whom that provision was addressed replied:

... that they were ready to comply with it in every respect, exactly as Their Highnesses command...

— Back of the Royal Provision.

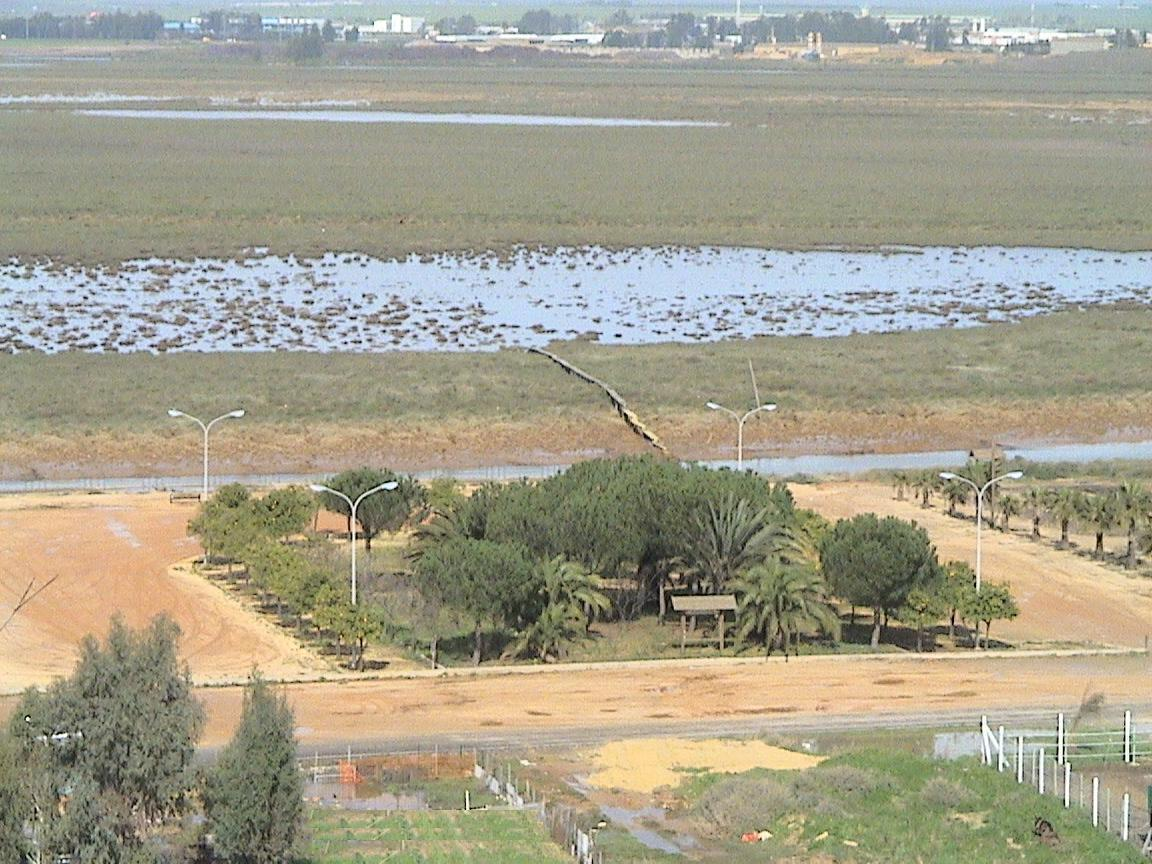
Port of Moguer and shipyards of La Niña

Another, general royal provision granted to Columbus by the Catholic Monarchs compelled the towns on the Andalusian coasts:

...the cities and towns and places on the coast of the sea of Andalusia, as well as of all our kingdoms and lordships (...) You know that we have ordered Christopher Columbus to go with three caravels to certain parts of the Ocean Sea as our captain (...) therefore we command all of you, and each one of you in your respective places and jurisdictions, that whenever the said Christopher Columbus should have need...

— Granada, 30 April 1492.
Archive of the Indies. Shelfmark: PATRONATO, 295, N.4.

With this latter provision he embargoed two ships in Moguer in the presence of the Moguer notary Alonso Pardo, vessels that would later be discarded. In Palos de la Frontera Columbus also carried out an embargo of vessels using the aforementioned provision, according to the testimony of Hernández Colmenero (Note: Testimony of Diego Hernández Colmenero in the Pleitos Colombinos....a las veynte e quatro preguntas dixo que sabe quel dicho Almirante por las provisiones de su alteza tomo navios e los embargo porque non fallava gente salvo los de crymen que fallo en esta villa en la cárcel della e que non fallava a otra persona alguna y el dicho Martin Alonso se concertó con el... — Evidence at Palos, 1 October 1515.) and, apparently, he also tried to do so in the nearby town of Huelva, according to the testimony of Pedro Ortiz. (Note: Testimony of "Pero Ortis" in the Pleitos Colombinos....a la onze pregunta dixo que lo que sabe desta pregunta es que al tienpo que se fizo la armada para yr a fazer el dicho descubrimiento la primera ves este testigo vido en esta villa de Huelva al dicho don Christoval Colon e al dicho Martin Alonso Pinçon los quales andavan adereçando navios e buscando gente para yr el dicho viaje... — Evidence at Palos, 10 January 1536.) But he still could not enlist the crew necessary for the enterprise. The monarchs then issued, on 20 June at Guadalupe, a power addressed to the town of Palos (Note: Poder al contino Juan de Peñalosa, para que vaya a la villa de Palos y haga ejecutar una carta de SS, AA., por la que ordenaban a Diego Rodríguez Prieto y a sus compañeros, que en cumplimiento de cierta sentencia contra ellos pronunciada, equipasen y armasen dos carabelas, las cuales ordenan SS. AA. se pongan al servicio de Cristóbal Colón, por lo que con él se tiene estipulado. General Archive of Simancas. Shelfmark: RGS,LEG,149206,25.) and a commission to the town of Moguer (Note: Comisión al contino Juan de Peñalosa, para que haga cumplir en la villa de Moguer, una cédula de SS. AA., ordenando se entreguen a Cristóbal Colón, donde y cuando las pidiese, tres carabelas armadas y equipadas. General Archive of Simancas. Shelfmark: RGS,149206,1.) so that they would comply with the earlier royal provisions, the one addressed to the town of Palos and the general one that Columbus used in Moguer.

== Ships ==
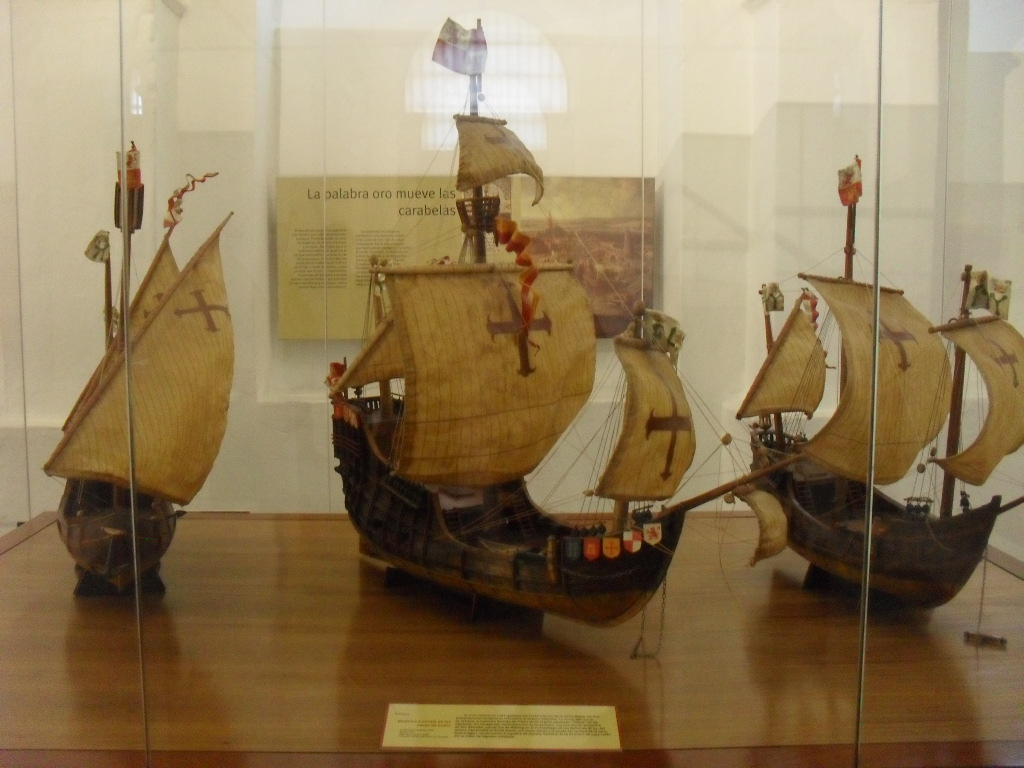
Models of the Niña, the Pinta, and the Santa María.

Palos de la Frontera was obliged, by virtue of the aforementioned royal provision, to supply two fully equipped caravels. But the seafaring men of the area, who were not obliged by the royal provision, were not willing to take part in an expedition with an unknown man, as Columbus was to them. Regardless of the greater or lesser credibility of Columbus's ideas, the men of Palos and its surroundings would hardly have supported the Genoese unless he was accompanied by some navigator respected in the town. Faced with the opposition of the residents and the sailors, Columbus resorted to one of the provisions issued by the monarchs in which he was granted permission to recruit sailors from among the imprisoned, recruiting only four convicts, a murderer and the three friends of the latter who had helped him escape from prison.

In these circumstances, and thanks to the help of the Franciscans of La Rábida Monastery and Pero Vázquez de la Frontera, an old and respected sailor of the region, Columbus met Martín Alonso Pinzón, a wealthy shipowner and natural leader of the region thanks to his many voyages in both the Atlantic and the Mediterranean, through which he had amassed fortune and fame. Besides the encouragement and influence of these friendships, the eldest of the Pinzón brothers may also have been persuaded by the proposal that, according to the testimony of Alonso Gallego, Columbus made to Martín Alonso:

...señor Martin Alonso vamos este viaje que si salimos con el y Dios nos descubre la tierra yo os prometo por la corona rreal de partir con vos como con vn hermano mio...

— Columbian lawsuits. (Note: Testimony of Alonso Gallego in the evidentiary proceedings of 1515, in Palos. Archive of the Indies. Section: Patronato. Shelfmark: PATRONATO,12,N.2,R.23.)

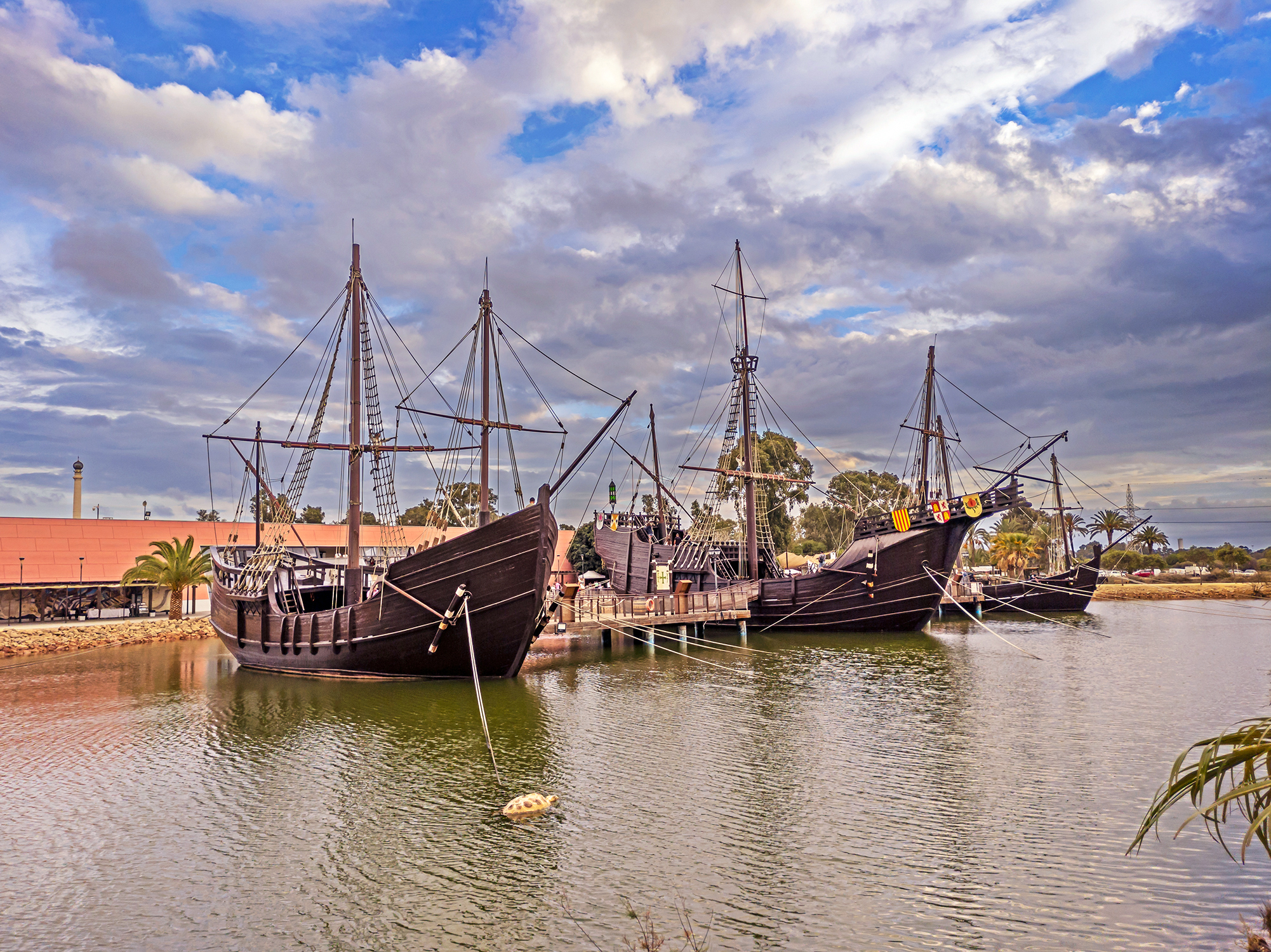
Replicas of the caravels at La Rábida (Palos de la Frontera)

Be that as it may, from that moment Martín Alonso began an energetic campaign in favor of the enterprise. He rejected the ships that Columbus had embargoed, contracting two new ones, La Pinta and La Niña, because, it is said, he knew they were very fast and "fit for the business of sailing", since he had leased one of them. According to Bartolomé de las Casas, Pinzón also lent Columbus from his personal estate half a million maravedís, covering one-third of the expedition's cash expenses. Martín Alonso convinced his brothers Francisco and Vicente, as well as the Niño brothers, a prominent seafaring family from Moguer—owners of the caravel La Niña—by means of whom he managed to encourage and enlist all the sailors necessary for the enterprise: men from Palos, from neighboring Moguer, from Huelva, from the rest of the district, and even from outside Andalusia, sailors who now were willing to risk that voyage, because the fact that Martín Alonso Pinzón, together with his brothers and the Niño family, were at the head of that fleet was a guarantee for the men of the Tinto-Odiel region.

Thanks to this, on 23 June the enrollment register (Note: A copy of this enrollment register survives, made by Columbus in 1498, entitled: "Rol o relación de la gente que fue con Cristóbal Colón en el primer viaje". One leaf of that document is missing. It was published in 1902 in the work: "Nuevos autógrafos de Cristóbal Colón y relaciones de ultramar: los publica la duquesa de Berwick y de Alba, condesa de Siruela". pp. 7-10.) was opened peacefully in Palos de la Frontera and the necessary sailors were freely enlisted. It is probable that, as Father Ortega states in his work, there was not enough time for the monarchs' writ—the power and the commission addressed to Palos and neighboring Moguer—to arrive within three days, because of the distance to be covered from Guadalupe to Palos de la Frontera, which, given the events that had already taken place, would have rendered them unnecessary.

=== Crew ===
The list of crewmen on the first voyage of discovery of 1492 is a matter of debate, since the full complement that took part in the first voyage of discovery is not known exactly, except for the best-known names: besides Christopher Columbus himself, there were the Pinzón brothers (Martín Alonso Pinzón was captain of La Pinta, Vicente Yáñez Pinzón was captain of the Niña, and Francisco Martín Pinzón was master of La Pinta); and the Niño brothers (Pedro Alonso Niño was the pilot and Juan Niño was master and owner of La Niña). Around the dates of the celebration of the Fourth Centenary, in 1892, various historians such as Cesáreo Fernández Duro, Nicolás Tenorio Cerero or Henry Vignaud; also in 1902 the Duchess of Alba published the 1498 copy of the embarkation "Rol" that provided 40 new names; however, it was the American historian Alice Bache Gould who compiled the list that, to date, is considered the most authoritative because of her exhaustive study of the original documentary sources from the various Spanish state archives. That list consists of 87 certain crewmen and 19 doubtful ones. Father Ángel Ortega, a Franciscan of La Rábida Monastery, whom Gould herself cited several times in her work, also carried out an exhaustive study of the crewmen of this voyage, though focused on the sailors of the Tinto-Odiel region.

== History ==
=== First voyage (1492–1493) ===
Ships of the first voyage
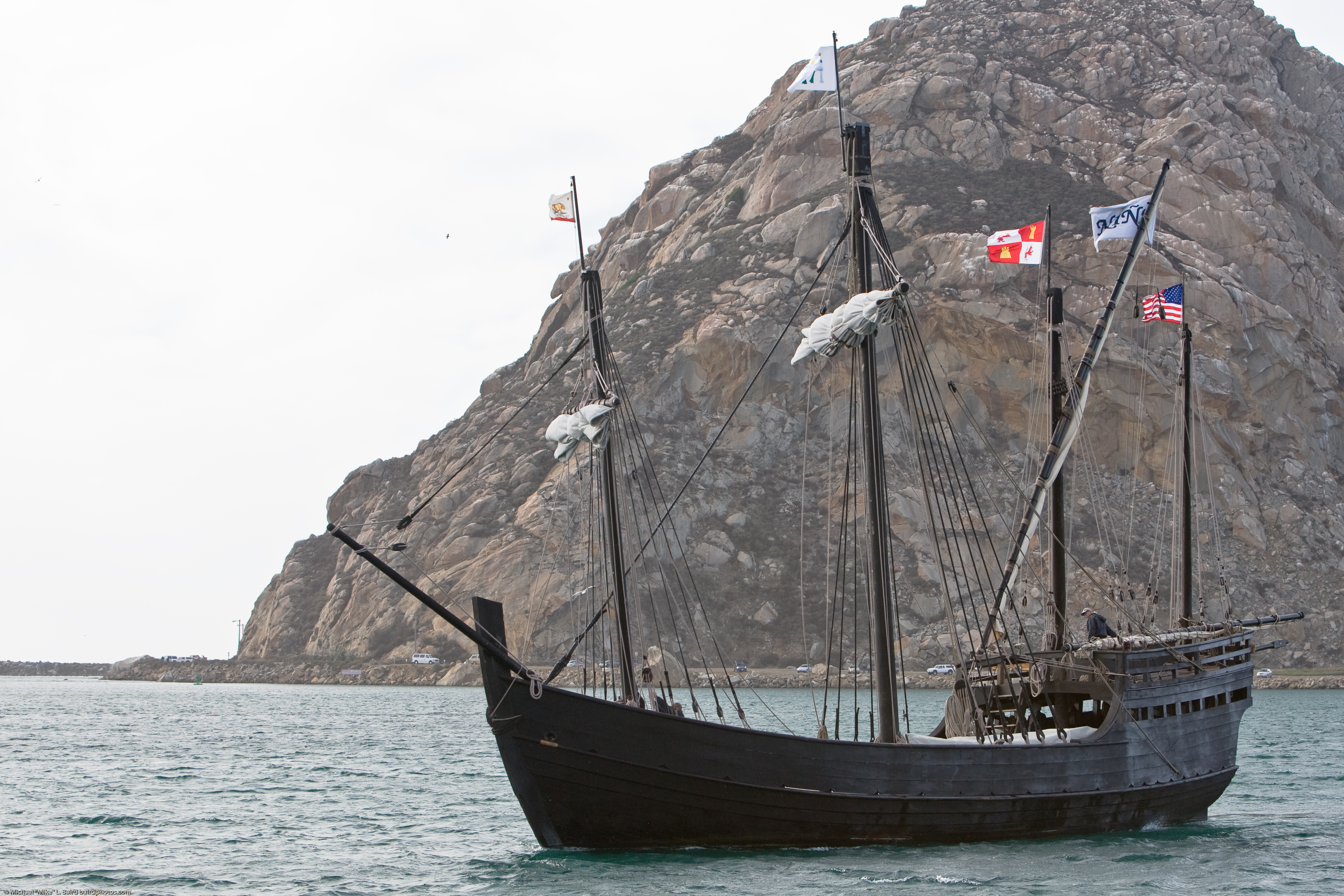
A conjectural replica of the Niña

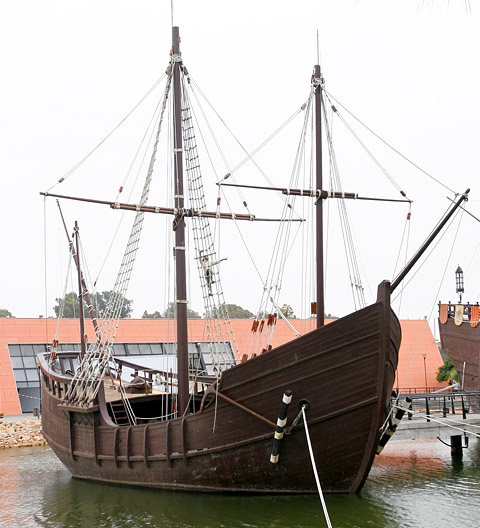
A replica of the Pinta in Palos de la Frontera, Huelva

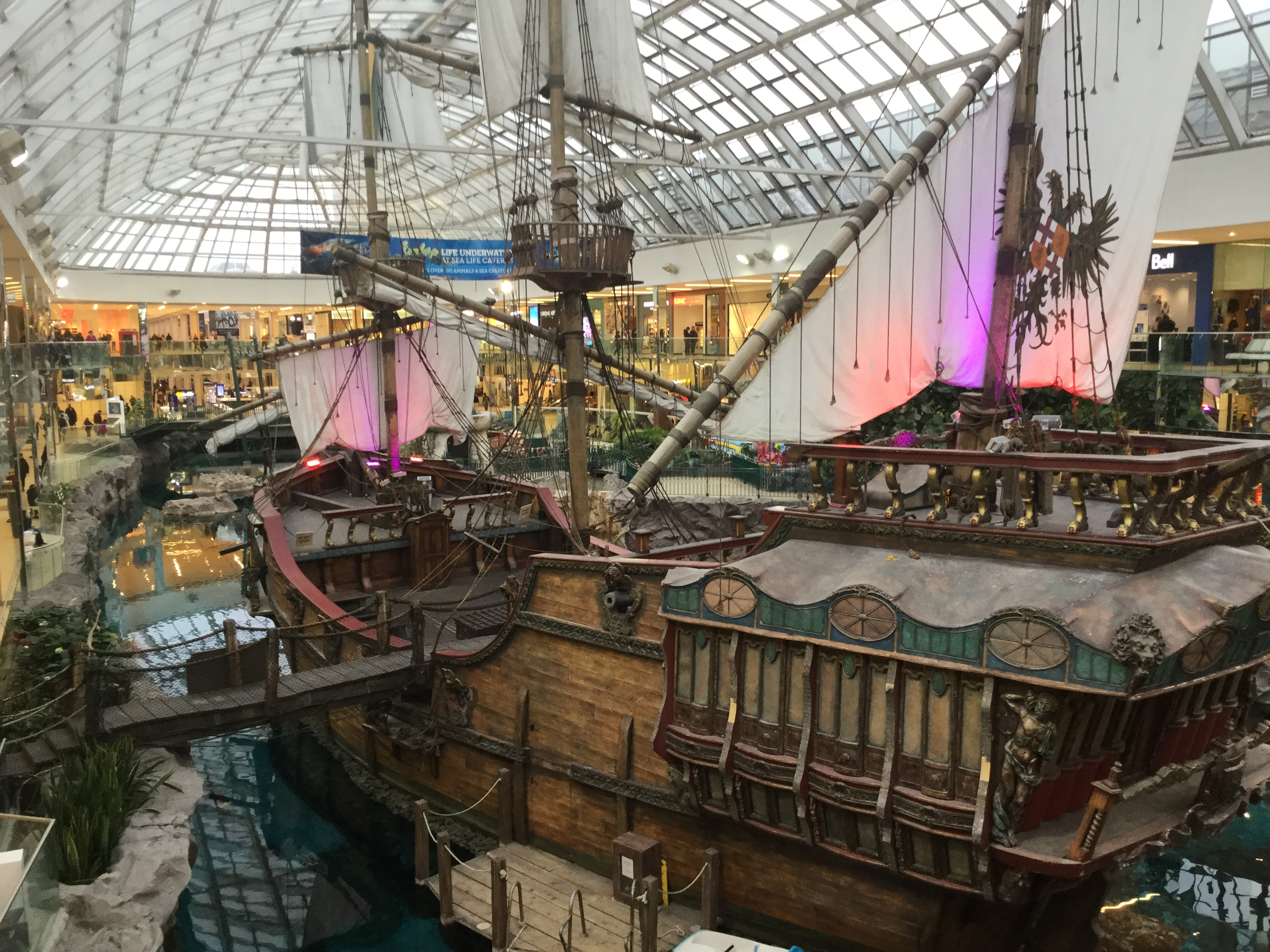
A replica of the Santa María at West Edmonton Mall

Captain's ensign of Columbus's ships

For his westward voyage to find a shorter route to the Orient, Columbus and his crew took three medium-sized ships, the largest of which was a carrack (Spanish: nao), the Santa María, which was owned and captained by Juan de la Cosa, and under Columbus's direct command. (Note: Always referred to by Columbus as La Capitana ("The Captain").) The other two were smaller caravels; the name of one is lost, but it is known by the Castilian nickname Pinta ("painted one"). The other, the Santa Clara, was nicknamed Niña ("girl"), perhaps in reference to her owner, Juan Niño of Moguer. The Pinta and the Niña were piloted by the Pinzón brothers (Martín Alonso and Vicente Yáñez, respectively). On the morning of 3 August 1492, the expedition departed from the Port of Palos, going down the Rio Tinto and into the Atlantic.

Three days into the journey, on 6 August 1492, the rudder of the Pinta broke. Martín Alonso Pinzón suspected the owners of the ship of sabotage, as they were afraid to go on the journey. The crew was able to secure the rudder with ropes until they could reach the Canary Islands, where they arrived on 9 August. The Pinta had its rudder replaced on the island of Gran Canaria, and by 2 September the ships rendezvoused at La Gomera, where the Niña's lateen sails were re-rigged to standard square sails. Final provisions were secured, and on 6 September the ships departed San Sebastián de La Gomera for what turned out to be a five-week-long westward voyage across the Atlantic.

As described in the abstract of his journal made by Bartolomé de las Casas, on the outward-bound voyage Columbus recorded two sets of distances: one was in measurements he normally used, the other in the Portuguese maritime leagues used by his crew. Las Casas originally interpreted that Columbus reported the shorter distances to his crew so they would not worry about sailing too far from Spain, but Oliver Dunn and James Kelley state that this was a misunderstanding.

On 13 September 1492, Columbus observed that the needle of his compass no longer pointed to the North Star. It was once believed that Columbus had discovered magnetic declination, but it was later shown that the phenomenon was already known, both in Europe and in China. (Note: Shen Kuo discovered 400 years earlier, in Asia, the concept of true north in terms of magnetic declination towards the north pole, with experimentation of suspended magnetic needles and "the improved meridian determined by Shen's [astronomical] measurement of the distance between the polestar and true north".)

==== First landing in the Americas ====
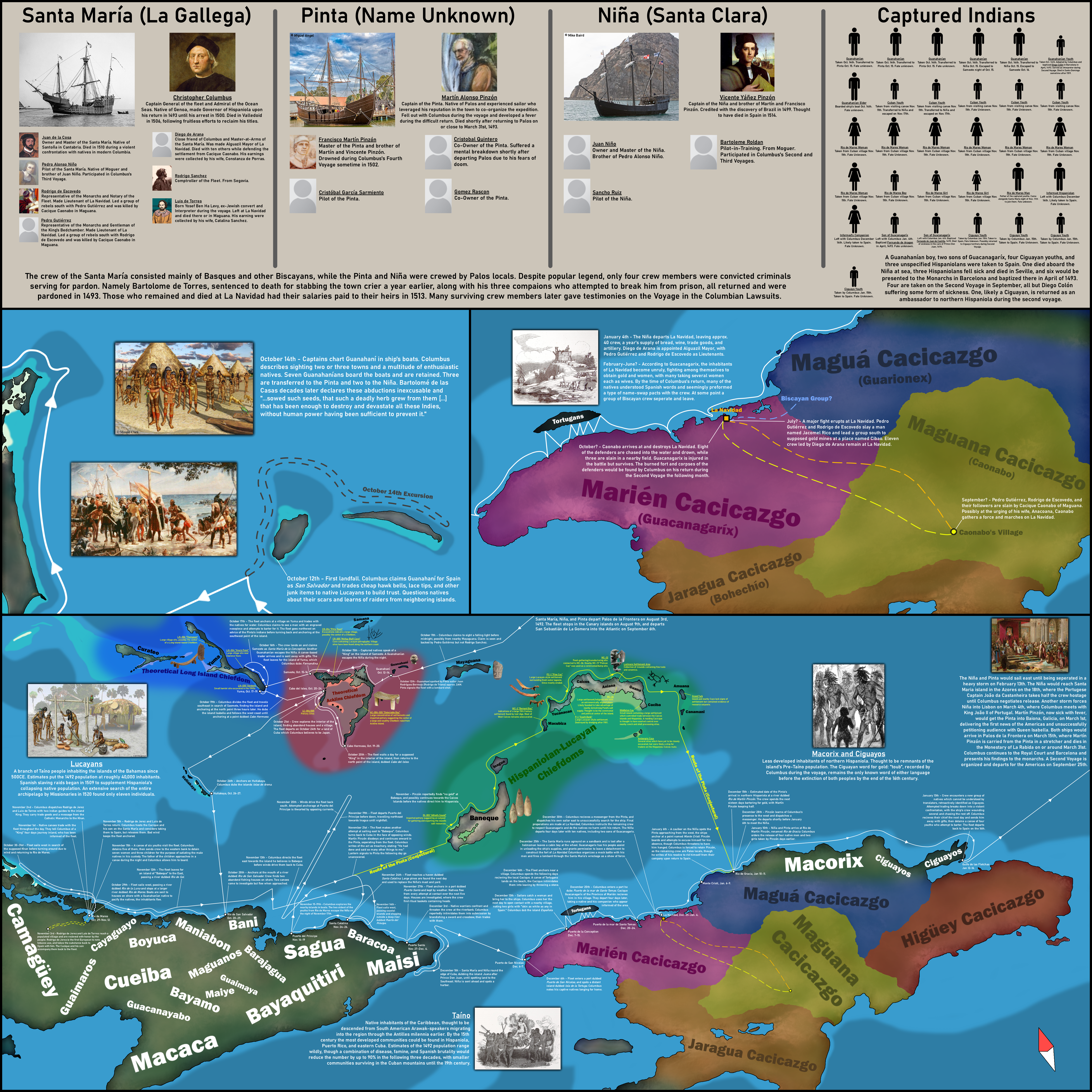
Route of the First Voyage from 11 October 1492 to 16 January 1493, including land journeys and contextual information.

After 29 days out of sight of land, on 7 October 1492, the crew spotted "[i]mmense flocks of birds", some of which his sailors trapped and determined to be "field" birds (probably Eskimo curlews and American golden plovers). Columbus changed course to follow their flight.

On 10 October, Columbus quelled a mutiny by sailors who wanted to abandon the search and return to Spain. On the next day, they saw several artefacts floating up the sea, which caused them to believe that land was nearby. Columbus changed the fleet's course to due west and sailed through the night, with many sailors looking for land. At around 10:00 PM on 11 October, Columbus thought he saw a light "like a little wax candle rising and falling". (Note: Two others thought they saw this light, one independently from Columbus. The strong winds and the fact that they were some 56 kilometres (35 mi) from land indicate that this was unlikely from a native inhabitant fishing.) Four hours later, land was sighted by a sailor named Rodrigo de Triana (also known as Juan Rodríguez Bermejo) aboard the Pinta. (Note: According to Samuel Eliot Morison, Triana saw "something like a white sand cliff gleaming in the moonlight on the western horizon, then another, and a dark line of sand connecting them.") Triana immediately alerted the rest of the crew with a shout, and the ship's captain, Martín Alonso Pinzón, verified the land sighting and alerted Columbus by firing a lombard. (Note: Columbus is said to have responded to Pinzón, "I give you five thousand maravedis as a present!") Columbus would later assert that he had first seen land, thus earning the promised annual reward of 10,000 maravedís.

They landed on the morning of 12 October. Columbus went ashore with the crew carrying a royal flag. The account of the voyage does not specify the image further and Columbus is often depicted with the royal banner of Castile. However, the royal flag was the flag of the Catholic Monarchs, which shows the heraldry of Castile and Aragon, and from the capture of Granada onward it would have also displayed a pomegranate in its lower part. His two captains accompanied him with two flags bearing a green cross and the letters F and Y, as a sign of Ferdinand and Ysabel (Isabel), the Catholic Monarchs of Spain. Columbus thought that he had landed in islands of the Indies, but in reality he was in the archipelago of a new continent.

There they made contact with the Indigenous people, who were impressed to see white men with beards, metal weapons, and enormous ships, even asking them if they came from heaven. (Note: The entry of the Diary corresponding to 14 October says:...and we understood that they asked us if we had come from heaven; and an old man came into the boat, and others in loud voices called everyone? men and women: come see the men who came from heaven: bring them something to eat and drink.) Columbus exchanged objects of little value with the Indigenous people and showed interest in the small quantities of gold that some of them wore. One of the things that attracted Columbus's attention on the island of San Salvador was that the Indians had scar marks on their bodies. Columbus pointed at them and asked what they were, and they said that Indians from other nearby islands came to take them and they defended themselves, although Columbus interpreted that those who came to take them actually came from the mainland. (Note: The entry of the Diary corresponding to 11 October says:...they brought us parrots and cotton thread in balls and javelins and many other things, and they traded them for other things that we gave them, such as glass beads and hawk's bells. [...] They do not carry arms nor do they know them, because I showed them swords and they took them by the edge and cut themselves out of ignorance. They have no iron: their javelins are sticks without iron, and some of them have at the end a fish tooth, and others of other things. They are all of good stature and size and good appearance, well made. I saw some who had signs of wounds on their bodies, and I made signs asking what that was, and they showed me how people from other nearby islands came there and wanted to take them and they defended themselves. And I believed and believe that they come here from the mainland to take them as captives...)

Columbus called this island San Salvador; its Indigenous name was Guanahani. The modern San Salvador Island (Note: Renamed from Watling's Island in 1925 in the belief that it was Columbus's San Salvador.) in the Bahamas is considered to be the most likely candidate for this island. (Note: Other candidates are Plana Cays, Grand Turk, Cat Island, Rum Cay, Samana Cay, or Mayaguana.) Columbus wrote of the Natives he first encountered in his journal entry of 12 October 1492:

Many of the men I have seen have scars on their bodies, and when I made signs to them to find out how this happened, they indicated that people from other nearby islands come to San Salvador to capture them; they defend themselves the best they can. I believe that people from the mainland come here to take them as slaves. They ought to make good and skilled servants, for they repeat very quickly whatever we say to them. I think they can very easily be made Christians, for they seem to have no religion. If it pleases our Lord, I will take six of them to Your Highnesses when I depart, in order that they may learn our language.

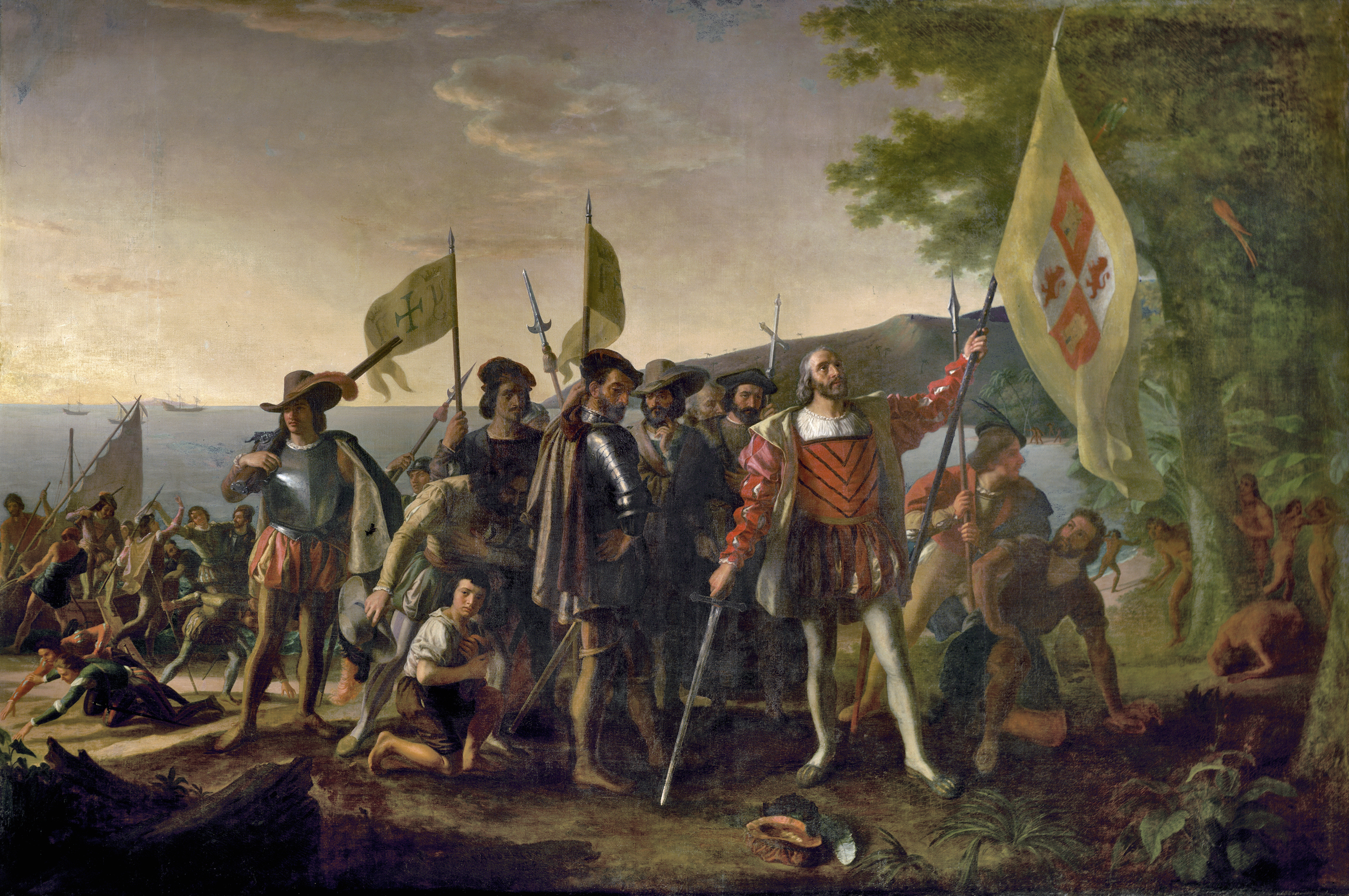
Landing of Columbus by John Vanderlyn, 1847. A depiction of Columbus claiming possession of the land in caravels (the Niña and the Pinta)

Columbus called the Indigenous Americans indios (Spanish for 'Indians') in the mistaken belief that he had reached the East Indies; the islands of the Caribbean are often called the "West Indies" because of this error.

Columbus initially encountered the Lucayan, Taíno, and Arawak peoples. (Note: At the time, three major Indigenous peoples populated the islands. The Taíno occupied the Greater Antilles, the Bahamas, and the Leeward Islands; they can be subdivided into Classic Taínos, who occupied Hispaniola and Puerto Rico; Western Taínos, who occupied Cuba, Jamaica, and the Bahamian archipelago; and the Eastern Taínos, who occupied the Leeward Islands. The other two peoples are the Kalinago and Galibi in the Windward Islands and Guadeloupe, and the Ciboney (a Taíno people) and Guanahatabey of central and western Cuba, respectively.) Noting their gold ear ornaments, Columbus took some of the Arawaks prisoner and insisted that they guide him to the source of the gold. Columbus noted that their primitive weapons and military tactics made the Natives susceptible to easy conquest. (Note: "... these people are very simple as regards the use of arms, as your Highnesses will see from the seven that I have caused to be taken ... unless your Highnesses should order them all to be brought to Castille, or to be kept as captives on the same island; for with fifty men they can all be subjugated and made to do what is required of them." (Columbus 1893, p. 41))

==== Exploration through the Antilles ====
From San Salvador they continued the voyage through the Bahamas and discovered a small island that Columbus called Santa María de la Concepción (present-day Rum Cay according to Samuel Morison, or present-day Samana Cay according to more recent studies) and another small island which he called Fernandina (present-day Long Island) in honor of King Ferdinand. A few days later he discovered another island which he called Isabela (present-day Crooked Island) in honor of Queen Isabella. Subsequently they headed toward the eastern coast of a large island which they called Juana (present-day Cuba), landing there on 28 October 1492. Columbus explored the northeast coast of Cuba. In 1515 the name Juana was replaced by Fernandina, because it was not considered appropriate for King Ferdinand to have dedicated to him only such a small island as that of the Bahamas.

They coasted Cuba slowly, without the possibility of trading due to the express prohibition of Columbus. On 2 November Columbus sent four men to explore the interior, two Europeans and two Indians. While waiting, Columbus measured the latitude with his quadrant and, according to Las Casas, obtained a value of 42° north, which in reality is impossible to observe from Cuba. On 12 November the explorers returned and Columbus hesitated for a week about which direction to take next, also disoriented by another measurement of latitude that again yielded 42°.

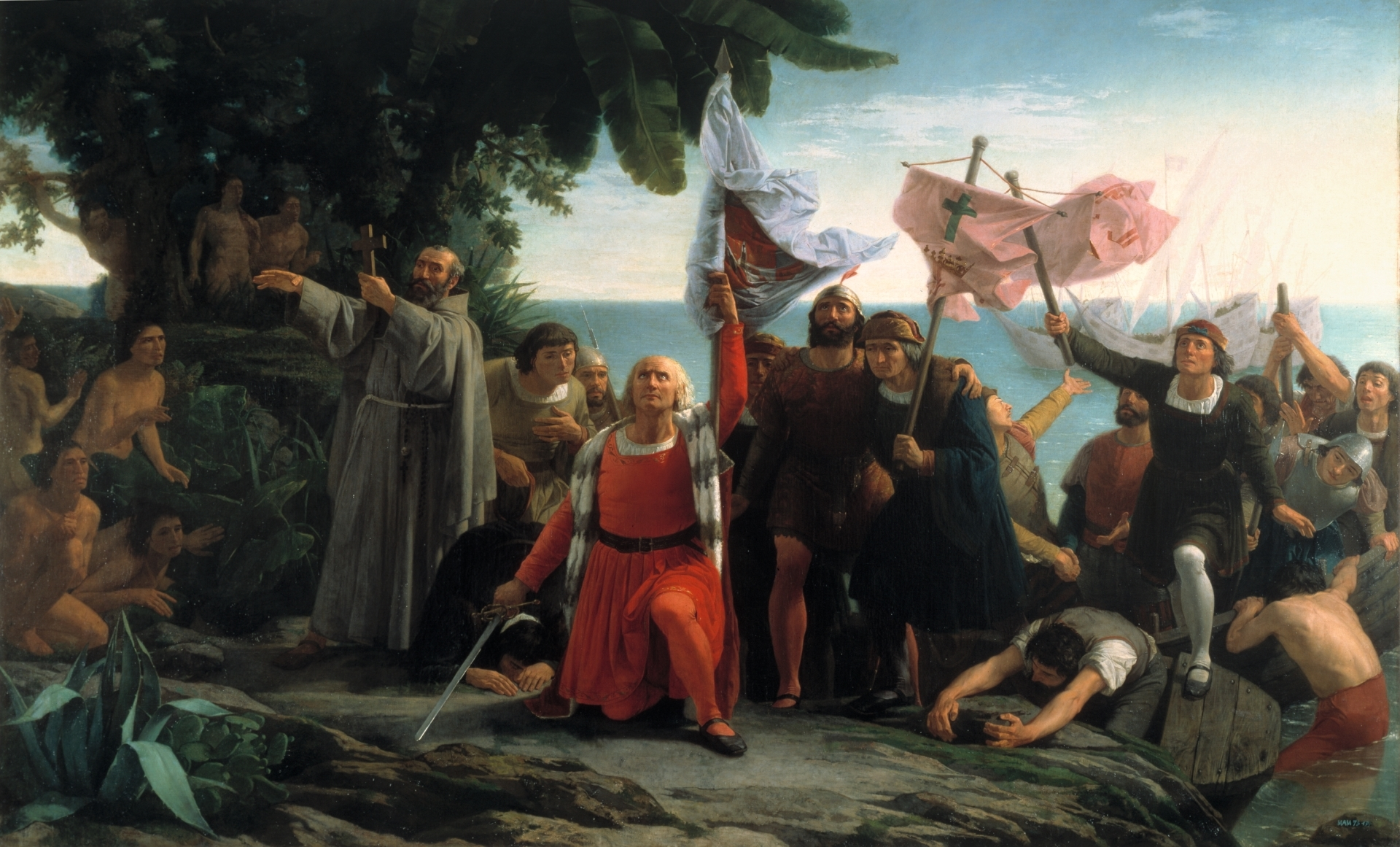
Romantic vision of the landing of Columbus on the island of Guanahani. Painting by Dióscoro Puebla.

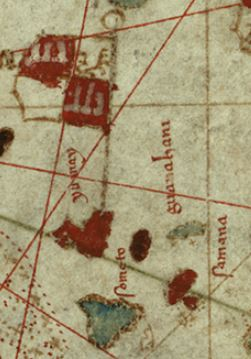
Guanahani, Samana, Yumay and Someto on the map of Juan de la Cosa, who participated in the expedition

On 21 November, Martín Alonso Pinzón, with the Pinta, separated from Columbus and headed east toward an island that the Indians called Babeque. The reason for the separation is unknown. The Columbian sources (Las Casas and Hernando Colón) say that Pinzón left "out of greed", though Fernández Duro states that it was a natural incident of navigation, while Jesús Varela Marcos believes that it was due to the frustration of Pinzón and his men with Columbus's authoritarianism and lack of nautical professionalism; according to Varela Marcos, Pinzón simply followed the previously marked route to go to Babeque. The route followed by Pinzón is also not known with certainty. Las Casas's Diario states that he obtained much gold. Hernando Colón, who tried to minimize Pinzón's discoveries because he believed they would harm his father's rights, wrote that Pinzón merely went to Babeque and from there to Hispaniola. According to Varela Marcos, several indications suggest that, after passing through Babeque, Pinzón sailed to Jamaica and from there rounded Hispaniola to the east. According to Gregory McIntosh, Pinzón discovered seven islands of the present-day Bahamas and Turks and Caicos, as well as the Babueca Shoals. There they found reddish pearls and then headed south.

Columbus continued sailing along the coast of Cuba to the east and on 5 or 6 December sighted the western end of a large island which he named Hispaniola. That same day Columbus explored the northwestern coast of Hispaniola, present-day Santo Domingo. He named a small gulf shaped like a harbor San Nicolás, because it was discovered on the day of that saint.

Columbus established contact through various envoys with one of the indigenous caciques (chieftains) of Hispaniola, Guacanagarix. There, the Santa María ran aground on a sandbank and was shipwrecked on Christmas Day, 25 December 1492; it had to be abandoned. Columbus was helped by the cacique to rescue the crew and the cargo. Columbus met with Guacanagarix personally; the cacique gave him gifts including a box with gold, and they both agreed that the Spaniards would protect the cacicazgo of Maraná of Guacanagarix from the cannibal cacique of the island called Caonabo, of the cacicazgo of Maguana; and that, for this purpose, before leaving Columbus would establish a settlement on the island defended by a garrison in a palisade: Fort Navidad, built with the remains of the Santa María in works that began on 26 December 1492. He left 39 men there, including the interpreter Luis de Torres. (Note: Torres spoke Hebrew and some Arabic; the latter was at the time believed to be the mother tongue of all languages.) Columbus kept sailing along the northern coast of Hispaniola with a single ship, until he encountered Pinzón and the Pinta on 6 January.

Meanwhile, the Pinta had also arrived on the north coast of Hispaniola, further east from where Columbus was. They discovered a harbor at the mouth of a river which they called de Martín Alonso (Note: Testimony of Francisco García Vallejo, resident of Moguer to the nineteen questions he said that he knows that one night the said Martín Alonso said farewell and departed from the Admiral and went to an island called Babueca and from there after discovering it he sailed more than two hundred leagues to the southwest from there and discovered the island Hispaniola and entered the river they call of Martín Alonso and there he gave it his name [...] and that he knows that Hispaniola and the river of Martín Alonso and the said gold the first man who discovered it was Martín Alonso Pintón, asked how he knows the aforesaid he said / that because this witness was present and saw everything with his own eyes. — Evidence in Palos, October 1515.) (later renamed Río de Gracia by Columbus; present-day Luperón Bay). According to Las Casas, they obtained much gold there by barter with the natives. News of Pinzón's arrival reached Guacanagarix on 27 December, who communicated it to Columbus. The cacique sent a canoe to investigate, in which Columbus embarked one of his men, but they did not locate the Pinta. Pinzón, for his part, also learned from the natives of Columbus's shipwreck some days earlier and decided to sail there. On 6 January he finally arrived where Columbus's Niña was. The two captains spoke and it seems that Columbus forgave Pinzón for separating with his ship; although according to the Diario this forgiveness was only apparent. In any case, the news of the gold pleased Columbus, who would later comment to the monarchs on the providence of God in having caused the Santa María to shipwreck in that place. One of the most interesting things about the voyage for the Admiral was discovering that on the island there existed a region which the indigenous people called Cibao, which sounded to Columbus similar to Cipango, which was how Japan was known to Europeans at the time.

On 13 January 1493, Columbus made his last stop of this voyage in the Americas, in the Bay of Rincón at the eastern end of the Samaná Peninsula in northeast Hispaniola. There he encountered the Ciguayos, the only Natives who offered violent resistance during this first voyage. Relations with the indigenous people had until then been predominantly peaceful, characterized by curiosity, mutual gifts, and cooperation. About seven Spaniards went ashore from the boats and began buying arrows, bows, and other weapons from the Ciguayos, but there came a moment when the Ciguayos did not want to give any more and ran to the place where they had set aside their bows and returned with cords to tie up the Christians. In the ensuing clash the Spaniards attacked them and stabbed one Ciguayo in the buttocks and shot another with an arrow in the chest; and the Indians, although they were fifty-some and the Spaniards only seven, saw that the Spaniards' weapons were more effective and ran away, while the sailors returned to the ship and told the Admiral what had happened, who had already warned them that this could occur. Because of the Ciguayos' use of arrows, Columbus named the inlet the Bay of Arrows (or Gulf of Arrows).

Four Natives who boarded the Niña at Samaná Peninsula told Columbus of what was possibly the Isla de Carib, which was supposed to be populated by cannibalistic Caribs, as well as Matinino, an island populated only by women, which Columbus associated with an island in the Indian Ocean described by Marco Polo.

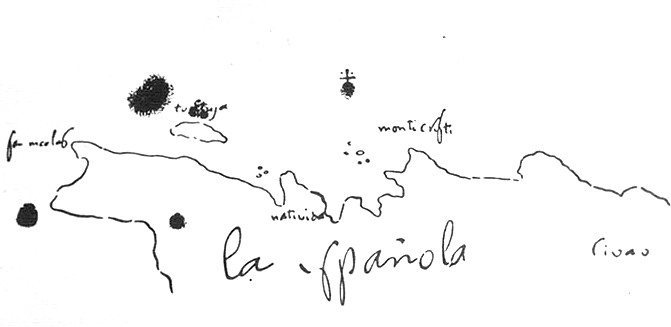
Map of the north coast of the island of Hispaniola attributed to Columbus. It is preserved in the archive of the Liria Palace, Madrid.

==== First return ====
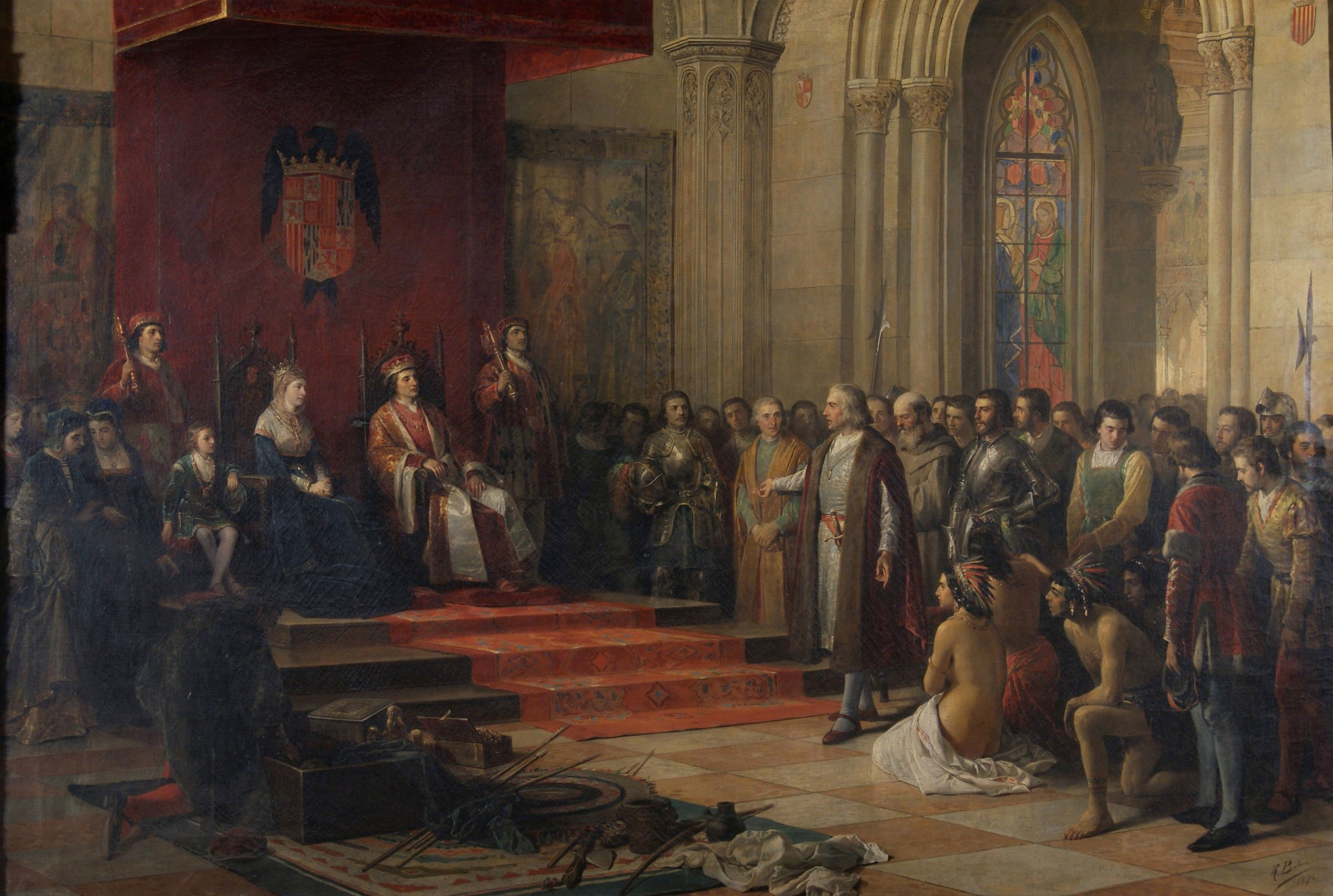
Depiction of Columbus before the Catholic Monarchs of Spain upon his first return. 1874 painting by Ricardo Balaca.

On 16 January 1493, the homeward journey began. While returning to Spain, the Niña and Pinta encountered the roughest storm of their journey, and on the night of 13 February lost contact with each other. All hands on the Niña vowed, if they were spared, to make a pilgrimage to the nearest church of Our Lady wherever they first made land.

On the morning of 15 February, land was spotted. Columbus believed they were approaching the Portuguese Azores Islands, but others felt that they were considerably north of the islands. Columbus turned out to be right. On the night of 17 February, the Niña laid anchor at Santa Maria Island, but the cable broke on sharp rocks, forcing Columbus to stay offshore until morning when a safer location was found nearby. A few sailors took a boat to the island, where they were told by several islanders of a still safer place to land, so the Niña moved once again. At this spot, Columbus took aboard several islanders with food. When told of the vow to Our Lady, the islanders directed the crew to a small shrine nearby.

Columbus sent half of the crew to the island to fulfill their vow, but he and the rest stayed on the Niña, planning to send the other half later. While the shore party were in prayer, they were taken prisoner by order of the island's captain, João de Castanheira, ostensibly out of fear that they were pirates. Castanheira commandeered their shore boat, which he took with several armed men to the Niña, planning to arrest Columbus. When Columbus defied him, Castanheira said he did not believe or care about Columbus's story, denounced the Spaniards, and went back to the island. After another two days, Castanheira released the prisoners, having been unable to get confessions from them or to capture his real target, Columbus. Some claimed that Columbus was captured, but this is contradicted by Columbus's logbook.

Leaving the island of Santa Maria in the Azores on 23 February, Columbus headed for Castilian Spain, but another storm forced him into Lisbon. He anchored next to a king's harbor patrol ship on 4 March 1493, where he was told a fleet of 100 caravels had been lost in the storm. Astoundingly, both the Niña and the Pinta had been spared. Not finding King John II of Portugal in Lisbon, Columbus wrote to him and waited for a reply. The king agreed to meet Columbus at Vale do Paraíso, despite the poor relations between Portugal and Castile at the time. Upon learning of Columbus's discoveries, the Portuguese king informed him that he believed the voyage to be in violation of the 1479 Treaty of Alcáçovas.

After spending more than a week in Portugal, Columbus set sail for Spain. He arrived back in Palos on 15 March 1493 and later met with Ferdinand and Isabella in Barcelona to report his findings. (Note: The Monument a Colom in that city commemorates the event.) (Note: A taster even tasted the food from each of his dishes before he ate to "make sure it was not poisoned". He was given his own footmen to open doors for him and to serve him at the table. Columbus was even rewarded with his own coat of arms.)

Columbus showed off what he had brought back from his voyage to the monarchs, including a few small samples of gold, pearls, gold jewelry from the Natives, a few Taíno he had kidnapped, flowers, and a hammock. He also brought the previously unknown tobacco plant, the pineapple fruit, and the turkey. He did not bring any of the precious East Indies spices such as black pepper, ginger or cloves. In his log, he wrote "there is also plenty of 'ají', which is their pepper, which is more valuable than black pepper, and all the people eat nothing else, it being very wholesome". The word "ají" is still used in South American Spanish for chili peppers.

Columbus brought captured Taínos to present to the sovereigns, never having met the infamous Caribs. In Columbus's letter on the first voyage, addressed to the Spanish court, he insisted he had reached Asia, describing the island of Hispaniola as being off the coast of China. He emphasized the potential riches of the land, exaggerating the abundance of gold, and that the Natives seemed ready to convert to Christianity. The letter was translated into multiple languages and widely distributed, creating a sensation in Europe:

Hispaniola is a miracle. Mountains and hills, plains and pastures, are both fertile and beautiful ... the harbors are unbelievably good and there are many wide rivers of which the majority contain gold. ... There are many spices, and great mines of gold and other metals...

Upon Columbus's return, most people initially accepted that he had reached the East Indies, including the sovereigns and Pope Alexander VI, though in a letter to the Vatican dated 1 November 1493, the historian Peter Martyr described Columbus as the discoverer of a Novi Orbis ("New Globe"). The pope issued four bulls (the first three of which are collectively known as the Bulls of Donation), to determine how Spain and Portugal would colonize and divide the spoils of the new lands. Inter caetera, issued 4 May 1493, divided the world outside Europe between Spain and Portugal along a north–south meridian 100 leagues west of either the Azores or Cape Verde Islands in the mid-Atlantic, thus granting Spain all the land discovered by Columbus. The 1494 Treaty of Tordesillas, ratified in the next decade by Pope Julius II, moved the dividing line to 370 leagues west of the Azores or Cape Verde.

=== Second voyage (1493–1496) ===
Columbus's second voyage (Note: Omitted from this image, Columbus returned to Guadeloupe at the end of his second voyage before sailing back to Spain.)

The stated purpose of the second voyage was to convert the Indigenous Americans to Christianity. Before Columbus left Spain, he was directed by Ferdinand and Isabella to maintain friendly, even loving, relations with the Natives. He set sail from Cádiz, Spain, on 25 September 1493.

The fleet for the second voyage was much larger: two carracks (naos) and 15 caravels. The two carracks were the flagship Marigalante ("Gallant Mary") (Note: Officially known as the Santa María after the ship lost on the first voyage and also known as Capitana ("Flagship") for its role in the expedition. It was owned by Antonio Torres, brother of the nurse to Don Juan.) and the Gallega; the caravels were the Fraila ("the nun"), San Juan, Colina ("the hill"), Gallarda ("the gallant"), Gutierre, Bonial, Rodriga, Triana, Vieja ("the old"), Prieta ("the brown"), Gorda ("the fat"), Cardera, and Quintera. The Niña returned for this expedition, which also included a ship named Pinta which was probably identical to that from the first expedition. In addition, the expedition saw the construction of the first ship in the Americas, the Santa Cruz or India.

==== Lesser Antilles and Puerto Rico ====
On 3 November 1493, Christopher Columbus landed on a rugged shore on an island that he named Dominica. On the same day, he landed at Marie-Galante, which he named Santa María la Galante. After sailing past Les Saintes (Todos los Santos), he arrived at Guadeloupe (Santa María de Guadalupe), which he explored between 4 November and 10 November 1493. The exact course of his voyage through the Lesser Antilles is debated, but it seems likely that he turned north, sighting and naming many islands including Santa María de Montserrat (Montserrat), Santa María la Antigua (Antigua), Santa María la Redonda (Redonda), and Santa Cruz (Saint Croix, on 14 November). He also sighted and named the island chain of Santa Úrsula y las Once Mil Vírgenes (the Virgin Islands), and named the island of Virgin Gorda.

On Santa Cruz, the Europeans saw a canoe with a few Carib men and two women. They had two male captives, and had recently castrated them. The Europeans pursued them, and were met with arrows from both the men and women, fatally wounding at least one man, who perished about a week later. The Europeans either killed or captured all aboard the canoe, thereafter beheading them. Another was thrown overboard, and when he was spotted crawling away holding his entrails, the Arawaks recommended he be recaptured so he would not alert his tribe; he was thrown overboard again, and then had to be shot down with arrows. (Note: This was arguably the first major battle between Europeans and Native Americans for five centuries, since the Vikings had come to the Americas in the 10th century.) Columbus's childhood friend Michele da Cuneo—according to his own account—took one of the women in the skirmish, whom Columbus let him keep as a slave; Cuneo subsequently beat and raped her. (Note: Tony Horwitz notes that this is the first recorded instance of sexuality between a European and Native American.) (Note: Cuneo wrote, While I was in the boat, I captured a very beautiful Carib woman, whom the said Lord Admiral gave to me. When I had taken her to my cabin she was naked—as was their custom. I was filled with a desire to take my pleasure with her and attempted to satisfy my desire. She was unwilling, and so treated me with her nails that I wished I had never begun. But—to cut a long story short—I then took a piece of rope and whipped her soundly, and she let forth such incredible screams that you would not have believed your ears. Eventually we came to such terms, I assure you, that you would have thought that she had been brought up in a school for whores.)

The fleet continued to the Greater Antilles, first sighting the eastern coast of the island of Puerto Rico, known to the native Taíno people as Borinquen, on the afternoon of 17 November 1493. The fleet sailed along the island's southern coast for a whole day, before making landfall on its northwestern coast at the Bay of Añasco, between the modern towns of Mayagüez and Aguadilla, early on 19 November 1493. Upon landing, Columbus christened the island San Juan Bautista after Saint John the Baptist, the preacher and prophet who baptized Jesus Christ, and remained anchored there for two days, 20 and 21 November 1493. Fleet member Diego Álvarez Chanca recounts that as they sailed along the southern coast of Puerto Rico, a Taino woman and boy, who had volunteered to join them on board in Guadeloupe, after having been rescued together with a group of at least 20 women the Caribs had been keeping as sex slaves, swam ashore, having recognized their homeland. The women rescued in Guadeloupe explained that any male captives were eaten, and that their own male offspring were castrated and made to serve the Caribs until they were old enough to be considered good to eat. The Europeans rescued three of these boys.

==== Hispaniola and Jamaica ====
On 22 November, Columbus sailed from San Juan Bautista (present-day Puerto Rico) to Hispaniola. The next morning, a native taken during the first voyage was returned to Samaná Bay. The fleet sailed about 170 miles (270 km) over two days and discovered, at Monte Cristi, decomposing bodies of four men; one had a beard implying he had been a Spaniard. On the night of 27 November, cannons and flares were ignited in an attempt to signal La Navidad, but there was no response. A canoe party led by a cousin of Guacanagari presented Columbus with two golden masks and told him that Guacanagari had been injured by another chief, Caonabo, and that except for some Spanish casualties resulting from sickness and quarrel, the rest of his men were well. The next day, the Spanish fleet discovered the burnt remains of the Navidad fortress, and Guacanagari's cousin admitted that the Europeans had been wiped out by Caonabo. Other Natives showed the Spaniards some of the bodies, and said that they had "taken three or four women apiece". While some suspicion was placed on Guacanagari, it gradually emerged that two of the Spaniards had formed a murderous gang in search of gold and women, prompting Caonabo's wrath. The fleet then fought the winds, traveling only 32 miles (51 km) over 25 days, and arriving at a plain on the north coast of Hispaniola on 2 January 1494. There, they established the settlement of La Isabela. Columbus spent some time exploring the interior of the island for gold. Finding some, he established a small fort in the interior.

Columbus left Hispaniola on 24 April 1494, and arrived at the island of Cuba (which he had named Juana during his first voyage) on 30 April and Discovery Bay, Jamaica, on 5 May. He explored the south coast of Cuba, which he believed to be a peninsula of China rather than an island, and several nearby islands including La Evangelista (Isla de la Juventud), before returning to Hispaniola on 20 August.

==== Slavery, settlers, and tribute ====
Columbus had planned for Queen Isabella to set up trading posts with the cities of the Far East made famous by Marco Polo, but whose Silk Road and eastern maritime routes had been blockaded to her crown's trade. However, Columbus would never find Cathay (China) or Zipangu (Japan), and there was no longer any Great Khan for trade treaties.

In 1494, Columbus sent Alonso de Ojeda (whom a contemporary described as "always the first to draw blood wherever there was a war or quarrel") to Cibao (where gold was being mined), which resulted in Ojeda's capturing several Natives on an accusation of theft. Columbus had the native chief set free. Ojeda cut the ears off of one Native, and sent the others to La Isabela in chains, where Columbus ordered them to be decapitated. During his brief reign, Columbus executed Spanish colonists for minor crimes, and used dismemberment as another form of punishment. By the end of 1494, disease and famine had claimed two-thirds of the Spanish settlers. A native Nahuatl account depicts the social breakdown that accompanied the pandemic: "A great many died from this plague, and many others died of hunger. They could not get up to search for food, and everyone else was too sick to care for them, so they starved to death in their beds."

By 1494, Columbus had shared his viceroyship with one of his military officers named Margarit, ordering him to prioritize Christianizing the Natives. Margarit's men exploited the Natives by beating, raping and enslaving them, but Columbus caught up with them and though outnumbered defeated them. After arriving in Spain in late 1494, Buil falsely complained to the Spanish court of the Columbus brothers and that there was no gold. Groups of Margarit's soldiers who remained in the west continued brutalizing the Natives, Columbus sought them out and slew them. In February 1495, he took over 1,500 Arawaks, some of whom had rebelled against the oppression of the colonists, and many of whom were subsequently released or taken by the Caribs. In June of that year, the Spanish crown sent ships and supplies to the colony on Hispaniola, which Florentine merchant Gianotto Berardi had helped procure, (Note: Amerigo Vespucci was an associate of Berardi.) who were alleged to be either cannibals or prisoners. (Note: Berardi became unwell in December, and recorded that Columbus still owed him 180,000 maravedís for his contributions. He also left his daughter to the admiral's care, calling him "his lordship", although it is unknown what became of her.)

Columbus's tribute system was described by his son Ferdinand: "In the Cibao, where the gold mines were, every person of fourteen years of age or upward was to pay a large hawk's bell of gold dust; (Note: The hawk's bells were to be filled with gold every three months. Based on Bartolomé de las Casas' account, the required quarterly weight was about the equivalent of $400 in 2021 currency.) all others were each to pay 25 pounds of cotton. Whenever an Indian delivered his tribute, he was to receive a brass or copper token which he must wear about his neck as proof that he had made his payment; any Indian found without such a token was to be punished." The monarchs, who suggested the tokens, called for a light punishment,. According to Hans Koning, "Whoever was caught without a token was killed by having his or her hands cut off." The Indians' only choice was to labor in the island's streams, sifting gold dust from the gravel in the stream beds. Because there was no abundance of gold on the island, the Natives had no chance of meeting Columbus's quota. Koning writes, "[T]hose Indians who tried to flee into the mountains were systematically hunted down with dogs and killed, to set an example for the others to keep trying." By 1497, the tribute system had all but collapsed.

Columbus became ill in 1495, and when he recovered, he led men and dogs to hunt down Natives who fled their forced duties, killing them or cutting off their hands as a warning to others.

The Spanish fleet departed La Isabela on 10 March 1496. Again set back by unfavorable trade winds, supplies began to run low; on 10 April, Columbus requested food from the Natives of Guadeloupe. Upon going ashore, the Spaniards were ambushed by arrows; in response, they destroyed some huts. They then held a group of 13 native women and children hostage to force a sale of cassava. The Niña and India left Guadeloupe on 20 April. On 8 June, the fleet landed at Portugal, near Odemira, and returned to Spain via the Bay of Cádiz on 11 June.

=== Third voyage (1498–1500) ===
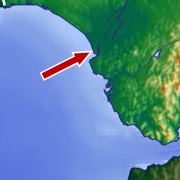
Location of Sanlúcar de Barrameda, the starting point for Columbus's third journey

Third voyage

According to the abstract of Columbus's journal made by Bartolomé de Las Casas, the objective of the third voyage was to verify the existence of a continent that King John II of Portugal suggested was located to the southwest of the Cape Verde Islands. King John reportedly knew of the existence of such a mainland because "canoes had been found which set out from the coast of Guinea [West Africa] and sailed to the west with merchandise." Italian explorer John Cabot probably reached the mainland of the American continent in June 1497, although his landing site is disputed.

On 30 May 1498, Columbus left with six ships from Sanlúcar, Spain, for his third trip to the Americas. Three of the ships headed directly for Hispaniola with much-needed supplies, while Columbus took the other three in an exploration of what might lie to the south of the Caribbean islands he had already visited, including a hoped-for passage to continental Asia. Columbus led his fleet to the Portuguese island of Porto Santo, his wife's native land. He then sailed to Madeira and spent some time there with the Portuguese captain João Gonçalves da Camara, before sailing to the Canary Islands and Cape Verde.

On 13 July, Columbus's fleet entered the doldrums of the mid-Atlantic, where they were becalmed for several days, the heat doing damage to their ships, food, and water supply. An easterly wind finally propelled them westwards, which was maintained until 22 July, when birds flying from southwest to northeast were sighted, and the fleet turned north in the direction of Dominica. The men sighted the land of Trinidad on 31 July, approaching from the southeast. The fleet sailed along the southern coast and entered Dragon's Mouth, anchoring near Soldado Rock (west of Icacos Point, Trinidad's southwesternmost point) where they made contact with a group of Amerindians in canoes. (Note: Trinidad was inhabited by both Carib-speaking and Arawak-speaking groups.) On 1 August, Columbus and his men arrived at a landmass near the mouth of South America's Orinoco river, in the region of modern-day Venezuela. Columbus recognized from the topography that it must be the continent's mainland, but while describing it as an otro mundo ('other world'), retained the belief that it was Asia—and perhaps an Earthly Paradise. On 2 August, they landed at Icacos Point (which Columbus named Punta de Arenal) in modern Trinidad, narrowly avoiding a violent encounter with the Natives. Early on 4 August, a tsunami nearly capsized Columbus's ship. The men sailed across the Gulf of Paria, and on 5 August, landed on the mainland of South America at the Paria Peninsula. Columbus, suffering from a monthlong bout of insomnia and impaired vision from his bloodshot eyes, authorized the other fleet captains to go ashore first: one planted a cross, and the other recorded that Columbus subsequently landed to formally take the province for Spain. They sailed further west, where the sight of pearls compelled Columbus to send men to obtain some, if not gold. The Natives provided nourishment including a maize wine, new to Columbus. Compelled to reach Hispaniola before the food aboard his ship spoiled, Columbus was disappointed to discover that they had sailed into a gulf, and while they had obtained fresh water, they had to go back east to reach open waters again.

Making observations with a quadrant at sea, Columbus inaccurately measured the polar radius of the North Star's diurnal motion to be five degrees, double the value of another erroneous reading he had made from further north. This led him to describe the figure of the Earth as pear-shaped, with the "stalk" portion ascending towards Heaven. (In fact, the Earth ever so slightly is pear-shaped, with its "stalk" pointing north.) He then sailed to the islands of Chacachacare and Margarita (reaching the latter on 14 August), and sighted Tobago (which he named Bella Forma) and Grenada (which he named Concepción).

In poor health, Columbus returned to Hispaniola on 19 August, only to find that many of the Spanish settlers of the new colony were in rebellion against his rule, claiming that Columbus had misled them about the supposedly bountiful riches they expected to find. A number of returning settlers and sailors lobbied against Columbus at the Spanish court, accusing him and his brothers of gross mismanagement. Columbus had some of his crew hanged for disobedience. He had an economic interest in the enslavement of the Hispaniola Natives and for that reason was not eager to baptize them, which attracted criticism from some churchmen. An entry in his journal from September 1498 reads: "From here one might send, in the name of the Holy Trinity, as many slaves as could be sold ..."

Columbus was eventually forced to make peace with the rebellious colonists on humiliating terms. In 1500, the Crown had him removed as governor, arrested, and transported in chains to Spain. He was eventually freed and allowed to return to the Americas, but not as governor. As an added insult, in 1499, the Portuguese explorer Vasco da Gama returned from his first voyage to India, having sailed east around the southern tip of Africa—unlocking a sea route to Asia.

==== Governorship ====
===== Colonist rebellions =====
After his second journey, Columbus had requested that 330 people be sent to stay permanently (though voluntarily) on Hispaniola, all on the king's pay. Specifically, he asked for 100 men to work as wood men, soldiers, and laborers; 50 farmers, 40 squires, 30 sailors, 30 cabin boys, 20 goldsmiths, 10 gardeners, 20 handymen, and 30 women. In addition to this, plans were made to maintain friars and clergymen, a physician, a pharmacist, an herbalist, and musicians for entertaining the colonists. Fearing that the king was going to restrict money allotted for wages, Columbus suggested that Spanish criminals be pardoned in exchange for a few years unpaid service in Hispaniola, and the king agreed to this. A pardon for the death penalty would require two years of service, and one year of service was required for lesser crimes. They also instructed that those who had been sentenced to exile would also be redirected to be exiled in Hispaniola.

These new colonists were sent directly to Hispaniola in three ships with supplies, while Columbus was taking an alternate route with the other three ships to explore. As these new Colonists arrived on Hispaniola, a rebellion was brewing under Francisco Roldán (a man Columbus had left as chief mayor, under his brothers Diego and Bartolomew). By the time Columbus arrived on Hispaniola, Roldán held the territory of Xaraguá, and some of the new colonists had joined his rebellion. Over months, Columbus tried negotiating with the rebels. At his behest, Roldán tried the other rebels, ordering his former partner, Adrián de Mújica, to be hanged.

Columbus was physically and mentally exhausted; his body was wracked by arthritis and his eyes by ophthalmia. In October 1499, he sent two ships to Spain, asking the Court of Castile to appoint a royal commissioner to help him govern. On 3 February 1500, he returned to Santo Domingo with plans to sail back to Spain to defend himself from the accounts of the rebels.

===== Bobadilla's inquiry =====
Bobadilla Betrays Columbus by Luigi Gregori, c. 1883 (Columbus murals at the University of Notre Dame)

The sovereigns gave Francisco de Bobadilla, a knight commander the Order of Calatrava, complete control as governor in the Americas. Bobadilla arrived in Santo Domingo in August 1500, where Diego was overseeing the execution of rebels, while Columbus was suppressing a revolt at Grenada. (Note: According to Las Casas, Christopher and Diego Columbus went about arresting rebels with a priest at hand so they could be forced to convert to Christianity before their execution.) Bobadilla immediately received many serious complaints about all three Columbus brothers, including that "seven Spanish men had been hanged that week," with another five awaiting execution. (Note: Bobadilla's 48-page report, derived from the testimonies of 23 people who had seen or heard about the treatment meted out by Columbus and his brothers—had originally been lost for centuries, but was rediscovered in 2005 in the Spanish archives in Valladolid. It contained an account of Columbus's seven-year reign as the first governor of the Indies. Consuelo Varela, a Spanish historian, states: "Even those who loved him [Columbus] had to admit the atrocities that had taken place.") Bobadilla had orders to find out "which persons were the ones who rose up against the admiral and our justice and for what cause and reason, and what ... damage they have done," then "detain those whom you find guilty ... and confiscate their goods." The crown's command regarding Columbus dictated that the admiral must relinquish all control of the colonies, keeping only his personal wealth.

Bobadilla used force to prevent the execution of several prisoners, and subsequently took charge of Columbus's possessions, including papers that he would have used to defend himself in Spain. Bobadilla suspended the tribute system for a twenty-year period, then summoned the admiral. In early October 1500, Columbus and Diego presented themselves to Bobadilla, and were put in chains aboard La Gorda, Columbus's own ship. Only the ship's cook was willing to put the shamed admiral in chains. Bobadilla took much of Columbus's gold and other treasures. Ferdinand Columbus recorded that the governor took "testimony from their open enemies, the rebels, and even showing open favour," and auctioned off some of his father's possessions "for one third of their value."

Bobadilla's inquiry produced false testimony that Columbus forced priests not to baptize Natives without his express permission, so he could first decide whether or not they should be sold into slavery. He allegedly captured a tribe of 300 under Roldán's protection to be sold into slavery, and informed other Christians that half of the Indigenous servants should be yielded to him. Further, he allegedly ordered at least 12 Spaniards to be whipped and tied by the neck and feet for trading gold for something to eat without his permission. Other allegations include that he: ordered a woman to be whipped naked on the back of a donkey for lying that she was pregnant, had a woman's tongue cut out for seeming to insult him and his brothers, cut a Spaniard's throat for being homosexual, ordered Christians to be hanged for stealing bread, ordered a cabin boy's hand cut off and posted publicly for using a trap to catch a fish, and ordered for a man to have his nose and ears cut off, as well as to be whipped, shackled, and banished. Multiple culprits were given a potentially fatal 100 lashes, sometimes while naked. Some fifty men starved to death on La Isabela because of tight control over the ship's rations, despite there being an abundance.

===== Trial in Spain =====
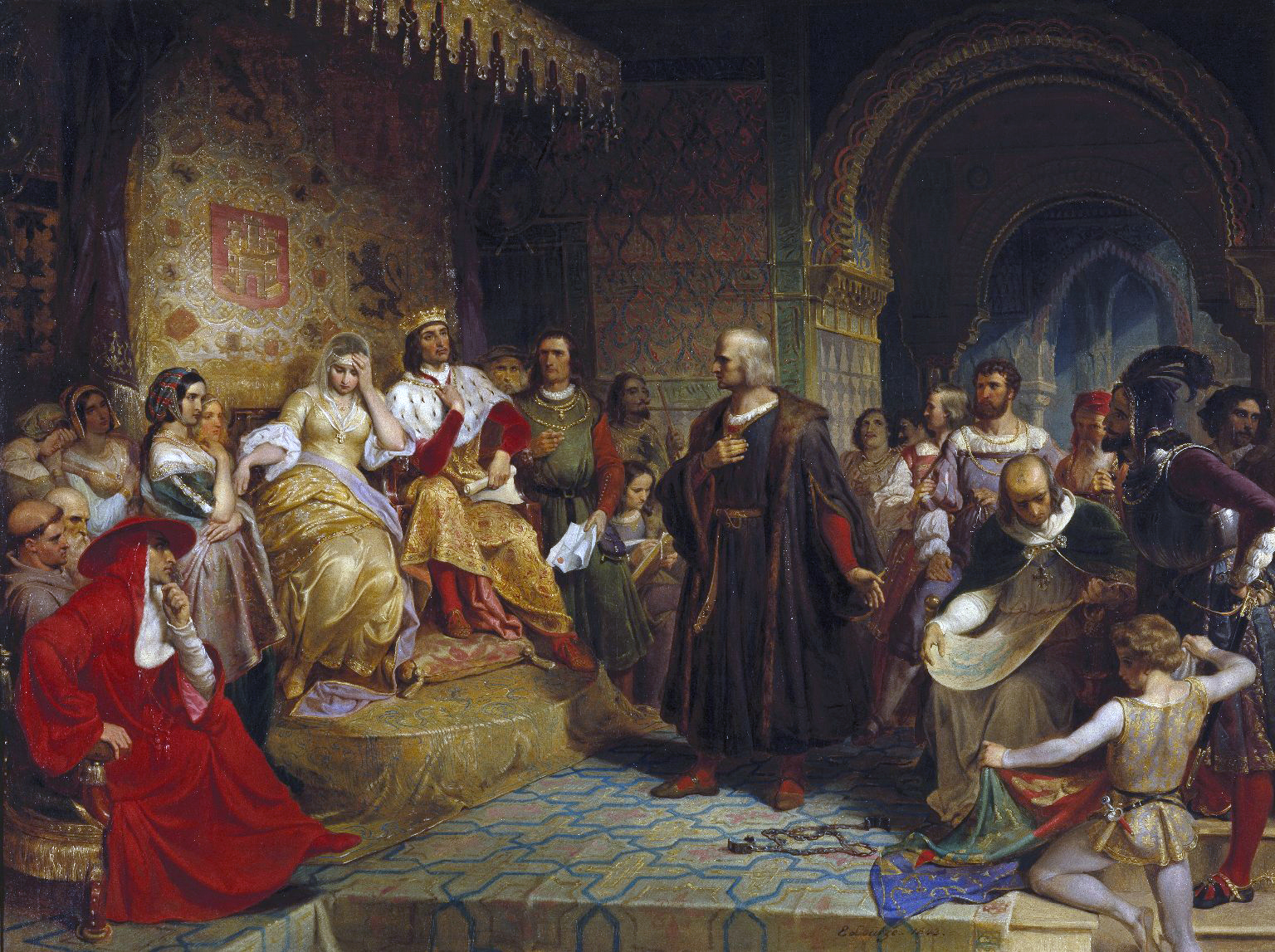
Columbus Before the Queen by Emanuel Gottlieb Leutze, 1843 (probably after an earlier work, Brooklyn Museum of Art)

A number of returned settlers and friars lobbied against Columbus at the Spanish court, accusing him of mismanagement. By his own request, Columbus remained in chains during the entire voyage home. (Note: Ferdinand Columbus later wrote, "I always saw those irons in his bedroom, which he demanded be buried with his bones.") Once in Cádiz, a grieving Columbus wrote to a friend at court:

It is now seventeen years since I came to serve these princes with the Enterprise of the Indies. They made me pass eight of them in discussion, and at the end rejected it as a thing of jest. Nevertheless I persisted therein... Over there I have placed under their sovereignty more land than there is in Africa and Europe, and more than 1,700 islands... In seven years I, by the divine will, made that conquest. At a time when I was entitled to expect rewards and retirement, I was incontinently arrested and sent home loaded with chains... The accusation was brought out of malice on the basis of charges made by civilians who had revolted and wished to take possession on the land... I beg your graces, with the zeal of faithful Christians in whom their Highnesses have confidence, to read all my papers, and to consider how I, who came from so far to serve these princes... now at the end of my days have been despoiled of my honor and my property without cause, wherein is neither justice nor mercy.

Columbus and his brothers were jailed for six weeks before the busy King Ferdinand ordered them released. On 12 December 1500, the king and queen summoned the Columbus brothers to their presence at the Alhambra palace in Granada. With his chains at last removed, Columbus wore shortened sleeves so the marks on his skin would be visible. At the palace, the royal couple heard the brothers' pleas; Columbus was brought to tears as he admitted his faults and begged for forgiveness. Their freedom was restored. On 3 September 1501, the door was firmly shut on Columbus's role as governor. From that point forward, Nicolás de Ovando y Cáceres was to be the new governor of the Indies, although Columbus retained the titles of admiral and viceroy. A royal mandate dated 27 September ordered Bobadilla to return Columbus's possessions. (Note: Columbus in his Book of Privileges listed all that which he believed was still owed to him.)

=== Fourth voyage (1502–1504) ===
Columbus's fourth voyage

After much persuasion, the sovereigns agreed to fund Columbus's fourth voyage. It would be his final chance to prove himself and become the first man ever to circumnavigate the world. Columbus's goal was to find the Strait of Malacca to the Indian Ocean. On 14 March 1502, Columbus started his fourth voyage with 147 men and with strict orders from the king and queen not to stop at Hispaniola, but only to search for a westward passage to the Indian Ocean mainland. Before he left, Columbus wrote a letter to the Governors of the Bank of Saint George, Genoa, dated at Seville, 2 April 1502. He wrote "Although my body is here my heart is always near you." Accompanied by his stepbrother Bartolomeo, Diego Mendez, and his 13-year-old son Ferdinand, he left Cádiz on 9 May 1502, with his flagship, Capitana, as well as the Gallega, Vizcaína, and Santiago de Palos. They first sailed to Arzila on the Moroccan coast to rescue the Portuguese soldiers who he heard were under siege by the Moors.

After using the trade winds to cross the Atlantic in a brisk twenty days, on 15 June, they landed at Carbet on the island of Martinique (Martinica). Columbus anticipated that a hurricane was brewing and had a ship that needed to be replaced, so he headed to Hispaniola, despite being forbidden to land there. He arrived at Santo Domingo on June 29, but was denied port, and the new governor refused to listen to his warning of a storm. While Columbus's ships sheltered at the mouth of the Haina River, Governor Bobadilla departed, with Roldán and Columbus's gold aboard his ship, accompanied by a convoy of 30 other vessels. Columbus's personal gold and other belongings were put on the fragile Aguya, considered the fleet's least seaworthy vessel. The onset of a hurricane drove some ships ashore, with some sinking in the harbor of Santo Domingo; Bobadilla's ship is thought to have reached the eastern end of Hispaniola before sinking. About 20 other vessels sank in the Atlantic, with a total of some 500 people drowning. Three damaged ships made it back to Santo Domingo; one of these had Juan de la Cosa and Rodrigo de Bastidas on board. Only the Aguya made it to Spain, causing some of Columbus's enemies to accuse him of conjuring the storm.

After the hurricane, Columbus regrouped with his men, and after a brief stop at Jamaica and off the coast of Cuba to replenish, he sailed to modern Central America, arriving at Guanaja (Isla de los Pinos) in the Bay Islands off the coast of Honduras on 30 July 1502. Here Bartolomeo found native merchants—possibly (but not conclusively) Mayans (Note: Most of Central America was part of the Mesoamerican civilization. The Amerindian societies of Mesoamerica occupied the land ranging from central Mexico in the north to Costa Rica in the south. The cultures of Panama traded with both Mesoamerica and South America and can be considered transitional between those two cultural areas.)—and a large canoe, which was described as "long as a galley" and was filled with cargo. The Natives introduced Columbus and his entourage to cacao. Columbus spoke with an elder, and thought he described having seen people with swords and horses (possibly the Spaniards), and that they were "only ten days' journey to the river Ganges". On 14 August, Columbus landed on the mainland of the Americas at Puerto Castilla, near Trujillo, Honduras. He spent two months exploring the coasts of Honduras, Nicaragua, and Costa Rica looking for the passage, before arriving in Almirante Bay, Panama, on 16 October.

In mid-November, Columbus was told by some of the Natives that a province called Ciguare "lie just nine days' journey by land to the west", or some 200 miles (320 km) from his location in Veragua. Here was supposed to be found "gold without limit", "people who wear coral on their heads" who "know of pepper", "do business in fairs and markets", and who were "accustomed to warfare". Columbus would later write to the sovereigns that, according to the Natives, "the sea encompasses Ciguare and ... it is a journey of ten days to the Ganges River." This could suggest that Columbus knew he had found an unknown continent distinct from Asia.

On 5 December 1502, Columbus and his crew found themselves in a storm unlike any they had ever experienced. In his journal Columbus writes,

For nine days I was as one lost, without hope of life. Eyes never beheld the sea so angry, so high, so covered with foam. The wind not only prevented our progress, but offered no opportunity to run behind any headland for shelter; hence we were forced to keep out in this bloody ocean, seething like a pot on a hot fire. Never did the sky look more terrible; for one whole day and night it blazed like a furnace, and the lightning broke with such violence that each time I wondered if it had carried off my spars and sails; the flashes came with such fury and frightfulness that we all thought that the ship would be blasted. All this time the water never ceased to fall from the sky; I do not say it rained, for it was like another deluge. The men were so worn out that they longed for death to end their dreadful suffering.

In Panamá, he learned from the Ngobe of gold and a strait to another ocean. After some exploration, he established a garrison at the mouth of Belén River in January 1503. By 6 April, the garrison he had established captured the local tribe leader El Quibían, who had demanded they not go down the Belén River. El Quibían escaped, and returned with an army to attack and repel the Spanish, damaging some of the ships so that one vessel had to be abandoned. Columbus left for Hispaniola on 16 April; on 10 May, he sighted the Cayman Islands, naming them Las Tortugas after the numerous sea turtles there. His ships next sustained more damage in a storm off the coast of Cuba. Unable to travel any farther, the ships were beached in St. Ann's Bay, Jamaica, on 25 June.

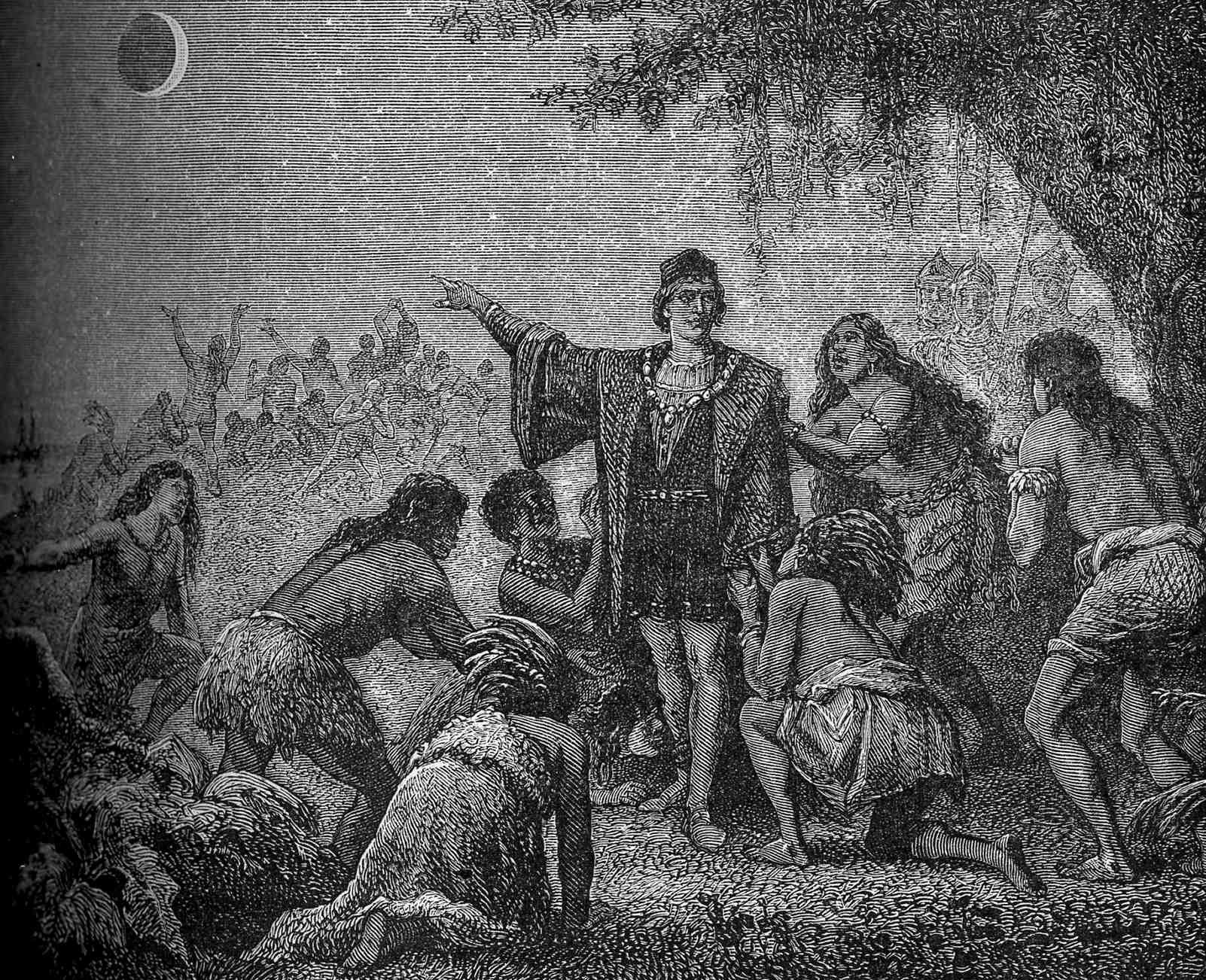
Illustration of Columbus awing and frightening the Natives by predicting a lunar eclipse (1879)

For a year Columbus and his men remained stranded on Jamaica. A Spaniard, Diego Mendez, and some Natives paddled a canoe to get help from Hispaniola. The island's governor, Nicolás de Ovando y Cáceres, detested Columbus and obstructed all efforts to rescue him and his men. In the meantime, Columbus had to mesmerize the Natives in order to prevent being attacked by them and gain their goodwill. He did so by correctly predicting a lunar eclipse for 29 February 1504, using the Ephemeris of the German astronomer Regiomontanus.

In May 1504 a battle took place between men loyal to Columbus and those loyal to the Porras brothers, in which there was a sword fight between Bartholomew Columbus and Francisco de Porras. Bartholomew won against Francisco but he spared his life. In this way, the mutiny ended. Help finally arrived from the governor Ovando, on 29 June, when a caravel sent by Diego Méndez finally appeared on the island. At this time there were 110 members of the expedition alive out of the 147 who sailed from Spain with Columbus. Due to the strong winds, it took the caravel 45 days to reach La Hispaniola. This was a trip that Diego Méndez had previously made in four days in a canoe.

About 38 of the 110 men who survived decided not to board again and stayed in Hispaniola instead of returning to Spain. On 11 September 1504, Christopher Columbus and his son Fernando embarked in a caravel to travel from Hispaniola to Spain, paying their corresponding tickets. They arrived in Sanlúcar de Barrameda on 7 November and from there they traveled to Seville.

== Legacy ==
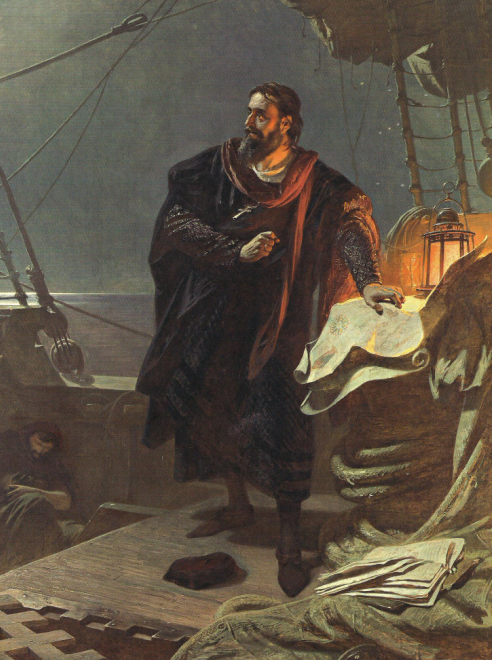
Painting of Columbus by Karl von Piloty (19th century)

The news of Columbus's first voyage set off many other westward explorations by European states, which aimed to profit from trade and colonization. This would instigate a related biological exchange, and trans-Atlantic trade. These events, the effects and consequences of which persist to the present, are sometimes cited as the beginning of the modern era.

Upon first landing in the West, Columbus pondered enslaving the Natives, and upon his return broadcast the perceived willingness of the Natives to convert to Christianity. Columbus's second voyage saw the first major skirmish between Europeans and Native Americans for five centuries, when the Vikings had come to the Americas. One of the women was captured in the battle by a friend of Columbus, who let him keep her as a slave; this man subsequently beat and raped her. In 1503, the Spanish monarchs established the Indian reductions, settlements intended to relocate and exploit the Natives.

With the Age of Discovery starting in the 15th century, Europeans explored the world by ocean, searching for particular trade goods, humans to enslave, and trading locations and ports. The most desired trading goods were gold, silver and spices. For the Catholic monarchies of Spain and Portugal, a division of influence of the land discovered by Columbus became necessary to avoid conflict. This was resolved by papal intervention in 1494 when the Treaty of Tordesillas purported to divide the world between the two powers. The Portuguese were to receive everything outside of Europe east of a line that ran 270 leagues west of the Cape Verde Islands. The Spanish received everything west of this line, territory that was still almost completely unknown, and proved to be primarily the vast majority of the continents of the Americas and the Islands of the Pacific Ocean. In 1500, the Portuguese navigator Pedro Álvares Cabral arrived at a point on the eastern coast of South America on the Portuguese side of the dividing line. This would lead to the Portuguese colonization of what is now Brazil.

In 1499, Italian explorer Amerigo Vespucci participated in a voyage to the western world with Columbus's associates Alonso de Ojeda and Juan de la Cosa. Columbus referred to the West Indies as the Indias Occidentales ('West Indies') in his 1502 Book of Privileges, calling them "unknown to all the world". He gathered information later that year from the Natives of Central America which seem to further indicate that he realized he had found a new land. Vespucci, who had initially followed Columbus in the belief that he had reached Asia, suggested in a 1503 letter to Lorenzo di Pierfrancesco that he had known for two years that these lands composed a new continent. A letter to Piero Soderini, published c. 1505 and purportedly by Vespucci, claims that he first voyaged to the American mainland in 1497, a year before Columbus. In 1507, a year after Columbus's death, the New World was named "America" on a map by German cartographer Martin Waldseemüller. Waldseemüller retracted this naming in 1513, seemingly after Sebastian Cabot, Las Casas, and many historians convincingly argued that the Soderini letter had been a falsification. On his new map, Waldseemüller labelled the continent discovered by Columbus Terra Incognita ('unknown land').

On 25 September 1513, the Spanish conquistador Vasco Núñez de Balboa, exploring overland, became the first European to encounter the Pacific Ocean from the shores of the Americas, calling it the "South Sea". Later, on 29 October 1520, Magellan's circumnavigation expedition discovered the first maritime passage from the Atlantic to the Pacific, at the southern end of what is now Chile (Strait of Magellan), and his fleet ended up sailing around the whole Earth. Almost a century later, another, wider passage to the Pacific would be discovered farther to the south, bordering Cape Horn.

In the Americas the Spanish found a number of empires that were as large and populous as those in Europe. Small bodies of Spanish conquistadors, with large armies of Indigenous groups, managed to conquer these states. The most notable amongst them were the Aztec Empire in modern Mexico (conquered in 1521) and the Inca Empire in modern Peru (conquered in 1532). During this time, pandemics of European diseases such as smallpox devastated the Indigenous populations. Once Spanish sovereignty was established, the Spanish focused on the extraction and export of gold and silver.

== See also ==
- Columbus Day
- Columbus's vow
- Exploration of North America
- Lugares colombinos
- Pre-Columbian trans-oceanic contact
- Knights of Colombus

== Bibliography ==
- Arranz Márquez, Luis (2006). Cristóbal Colón: misterio y grandeza (in Spanish). Madrid: Marcial Pons Historia. ISBN 9788496467231.
- Bache Gould, Alice (1984). Nueva lista documentada de los tripulantes de Colón en 1492 (in Spanish). Madrid: Real Academia de la Historia.
- Bergreen, Laurence (2011). Columbus: The Four Voyages, 1492–1504. Penguin Group. ISBN 9781101544327.
- Colón, Hernando (1892). Historia del almirante don Cristóbal Colón (in Spanish). Madrid: Librería de la Viuda de Hernando y Compañía.
- Columbus, Christopher (1893). Markham, Clements R. (ed.). The Journal of Christopher Columbus (During His First Voyage, 1492–93). London: Hakluyt Society.
- Cook, Noble David (1998). Born to Die: Disease and New World Conquest, 1492–1650. Cambridge: Cambridge University Press. ISBN 9780521627306.
- De las Casas, Bartolomé (1875). Historia de las Indias (in Spanish). Vol. 1. Madrid: Imprenta de Miguel Ginesta.
- Diario de Colón (1892). Relaciones y cartas de Cristóbal Colón (in Spanish). Madrid: Librería de la Viuda de Hernando y Compañía.
- Díaz-Trechuelo Spínola, María Lourdes (2006). Cristóbal Colón, su tiempo y sus reflejos (in Spanish). Sevilla: Centro de Estudios Andaluces.
- Dugard, Martin (2005). The Last Voyage of Columbus. New York: Little, Brown and Company. ISBN 9780316154345.
- Dyson, John (1991). Columbus: For Gold, God and Glory. Madison Press. ISBN 9780670837250.
- Fernández Duro, Cesáreo (1883). Colón y Pinzón (in Spanish). Madrid: Imprenta y Fundición de Manuel Tello.
- Fernández Duro, Cesáreo (1892). Pinzón en el descubrimiento de las Indias. Madrid: Sucesores de Rivadeneyra.
- Fernández-Armesto, Felipe (2007). Amerigo: The Man Who Gave His Name to America. New York: Random House. ISBN 9781400062812.
- González Cruz, David (2012). Descubridores de América: Colón, los marinos y los puertos (in Spanish). Madrid: Silex.
- Joseph, Theodore (1838). The Life of Christopher Columbus. New York: Harper & Brothers.
- Manzano y Manzano, Juan; Manzano Fernández-Heredia, Ana María (1988). Los Pinzones y el Descubrimiento de América (in Spanish). Vol. 1. Madrid: Ediciones de Cultura Hispánica. ISBN 9788472324428.
- Morales Padrón, Francisco (1981). Primeras cartas sobre América (1493–1503) (in Spanish). Sevilla: Secretariado de Publicaciones de la Universidad de Sevilla.
- Morison, Samuel Eliot (1991). Admiral of the Ocean Sea: A Life of Christopher Columbus. Boston: Little, Brown. ISBN 9780316584784.
- Murphy, Cullen; Coye, Raymond (2013). What Great Paintings Say. New York: Harry N. Abrams. ISBN 9781419709067.
- Muro Orejón, Antonio (1964). Pleitos colombinos (in Spanish). Vol. 8. Sevilla: Escuela de Estudios Hispano-Americanos.
- Muro Orejón, Antonio (1989). Pleitos colombinos (in Spanish). Vol. 4. Sevilla: Escuela de Estudios Hispano-Americanos.
- Ortega, Ángel (1925). La Rábida, Colón y los marinos del Tinto-Odiel en el descubrimiento de América (in Spanish). Huelva: Imprenta del Asilo Provincial.
- Phillips, William D.; Phillips, Carla Rahn (1992). The Worlds of Christopher Columbus. Cambridge: Cambridge University Press. ISBN 9780521350976.
- Russell, Jeffrey Burton (1991). Inventing the Flat Earth: Columbus and Modern Historians. New York: Praeger. ISBN 9780275939564.
- Varela, Consuelo (2010). Cristóbal Colón: Textos y documentos completos (in Spanish). Madrid: Alianza Editorial.
- Varela Marcos, Jesús (2005). Cristóbal Colón y el descubrimiento de América (in Spanish). Madrid: Rialp.
- Verlinden, Charles; Pérez-Embid, Florentino (1967). Cristóbal Colón y el descubrimiento de América (in Spanish). Madrid: Rialp.
- Zinn, Howard (2003). A People's History of the United States. New York: HarperCollins. ISBN 9780060528379.
