= Book of Prophecies =

1502–1505 book by Christopher Columbus

The Book of Prophecies (in Spanish, El Libro de las Profecías) is a compilation of apocalyptical religious revelations written by Christopher Columbus towards the end of his life, probably with the assistance of his friend, the Carthusian monk Gaspar Gorricio. It was written between September 1501 and March 1502, with additions until about 1505.

This journal of sorts conveys the medieval notion that in order for the end of the world or the second coming of Jesus Christ to occur, certain events must first be enacted:

1. Christianity must be spread throughout the world.
2. The Garden of Eden must be found - It was the common belief in the Middle Ages that the biblical Garden of Eden must have been on the top of a crag or mountaintop so that it would not have been affected by the first destruction of the world by flood. Upon arriving in Venezuela in 1498, Columbus may have thought that the verdant crags of Venezuela bore the garden of the Old Testament of the Bible.
3. A Last Crusade must take back the Holy Land from the Muslims, and that when Christ comes, he will come back in the place he lived and died: Jerusalem.
4. A Last World Emperor must be chosen - Columbus had chosen, at least in his mind, that the Catholic Monarchs, Ferdinand and Isabella, would fulfill this position due to the vast imperial power and religious conviction the Spanish monarchs claimed. A last world emperor would be necessary to lead the aforementioned crusade against the Muslims and to greet Christ at Jerusalem once the previous steps had been completed.

Such notions were not new to the period in which Columbus lived. Medieval monastic writers, such as Joachim of Fiore, had made similar claims, which strongly influenced Columbus' apocalyptic writings and beliefs.

The manuscript was written by Columbus following his third voyage to the New World. The original manuscript is mostly in Spanish with some Latin. The manuscript was translated into English with commentary by Delno C. West and August Kling and published by the University of Florida Press, Gainesville, in 1991.

== See also ==
- Book of Privileges
