= Port of Palos =

Port in Spain

Coordinates: 37.2315°N 6.8941°W

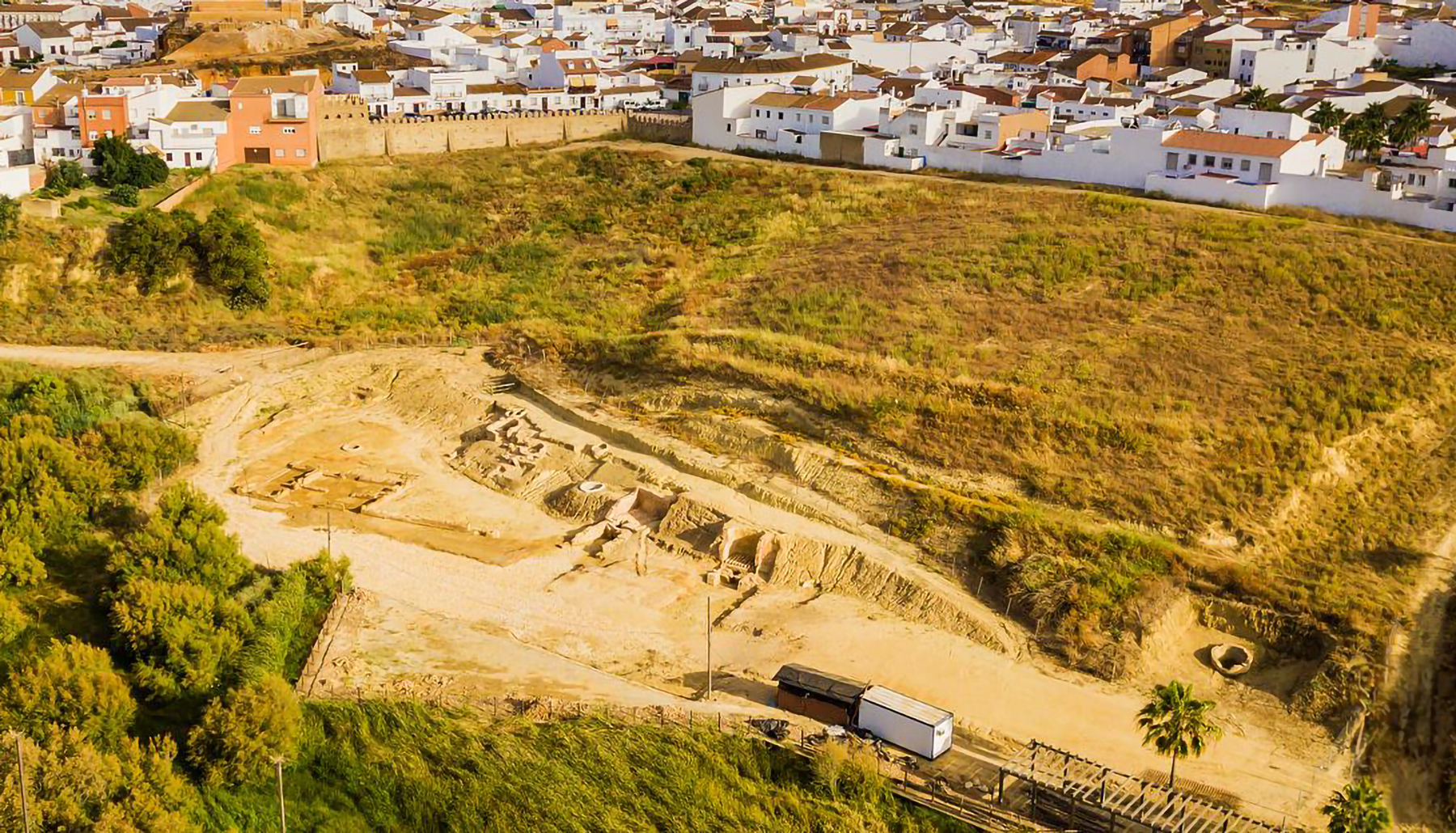
Archaeological site

The port of Palos was the port of the town of Palos de la Frontera in the mouth of the Tinto river in the Gulf of Cádiz. It was located in a small elongated cove (currently silted) near the site of Fontanilla, close to the old castle.

Palos developed in the left (eastern) bank of the Tinto river. Palos and other port towns in the Atlantic coast of the current-day province of Huelva gained strategic clout in the second half of the 15th century. Although maritime operations linked Palos with Mediterranean (Italy) and North Atlantic ports (Portugal, England, Brittany, Flanders), its activity primarily focused on the African trade route down to the Gulf of Guinea opened by the Portuguese, against whom the port vied in this regard. To a lesser extent the port's activity also relied on commerce raiding (both under royal and nobiliary initiative as well as funded by independent operators). The Catholic Monarchs promoted Palos in the context of the War of the Castilian Succession. Even after the Treaty of Alcaçovas (1479) acknowledging Portuguese hegemony in the Southern Atlantic, the sailors from Palos did not cease to fish, sail, and trade along the African coast. However, after the treaty, the hitherto lauded Guinean incursions were considered a crime and were subsequently punished.

In June 1492, the port (alongside half of the lordship of Palos) was acquired by the Catholic Monarchs from the Count of Cifuentes Pedro Silva and his brother Juan Silva in exchange of 16,400,000 maravedíes, so the expedition of Columbus could depart from a realengo (royal demesne) port.
