= Bay of Rincón =

Bay in the Dominican Republic

Coordinates: 19°17′55″N 69°14′25″W

Rincón Bay is a V-shape bay in the northeasternmost in the Samaná Peninsula in the Dominican Republic. The road to playa Rincon has been since paved all the way to the beach for easy access by car. The road right on the beach is a sand road to go up and down the beach but cars can travel with common sense.

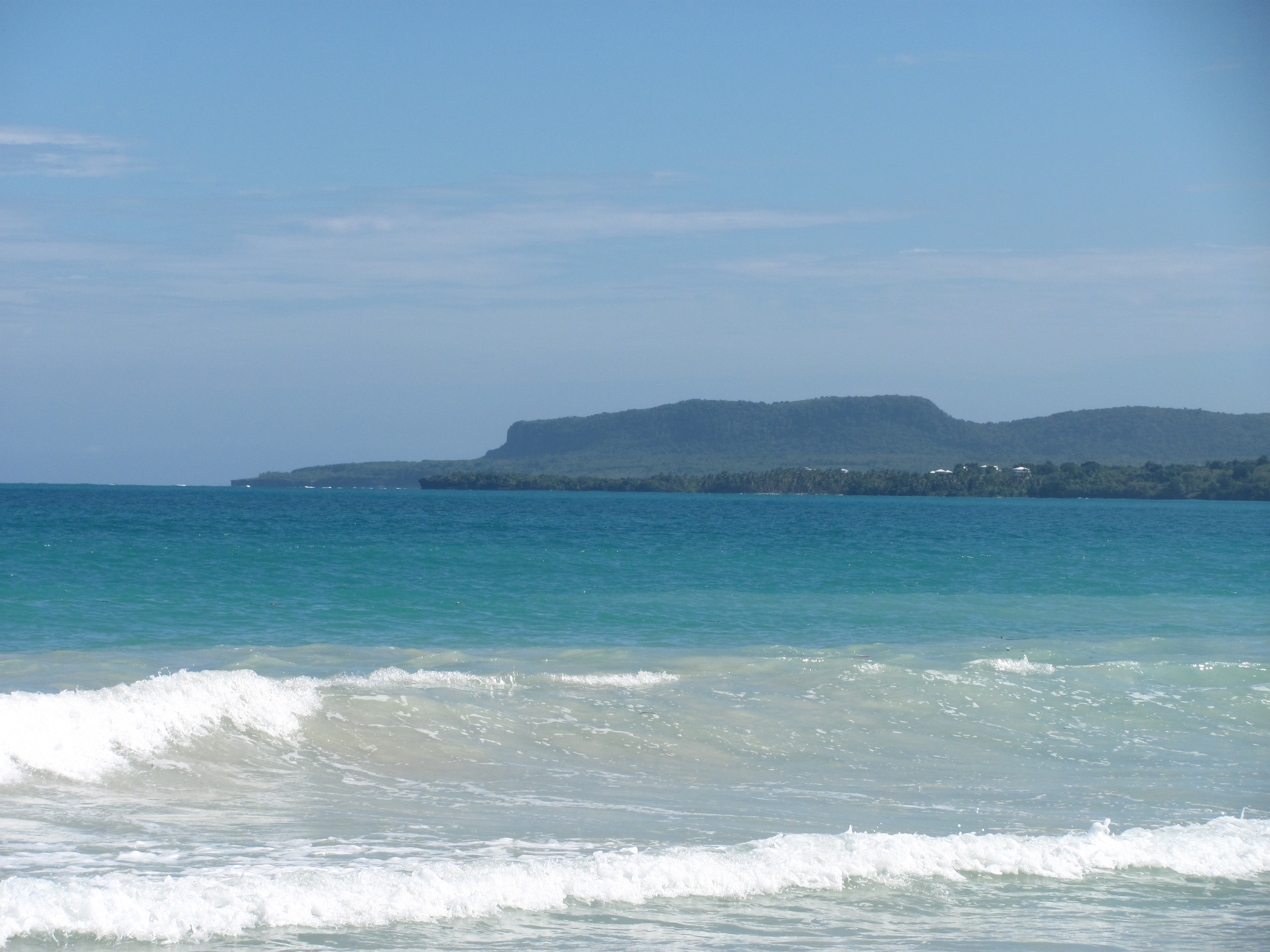
Cabo Samaná viewed from the Rincón Bay.

The site is known for the Indigenous Cigüayos who in this place were the first to resist Christopher Columbus' men with violence. For this reason, the admiral gave it the name of the Bay of Arrows. It is located north of the town of Santa Bárbara de Samaná. It is gated from the Antilles Current by Cabo Cabrón and Cabo Samaná. The resort town of Las Galeras sits on the eastern side of the bay.

== See also ==
Scottish Bay
