= Bay of Arrows =

Bay in Dominican Republic

Golfo de Las Flechas or Bay of Arrows refers to a bay on the northeastern side of the island of Hispaniola in the present day Dominican Republic where there was a small skirmish between Christopher Columbus’ crew and the Cigüayos that lived there during Columbus' first voyage. It lies around 69 degrees west and 19 degrees north. The Bay of Arrows underwent a name change after being discovered by Christopher Columbus in January 1493. There is a current debate surrounding its location where some argue it is the present-day Samaná Bay while others claim it is the present-day Bay of Rincón.

== Background ==
On his first voyage, Christopher Columbus had mostly amicable encounters with the Taínos, one of the Indigenous people of the Caribbean islands. He sailed along the islands' coast, entering into capes and harbors to look at the scenery, hoping to find cities and large groups of population to trade with. Ultimately, what he expected was to reach the outer limits of the Chinese empire. Because he never found what he was looking for, he rarely went onto the land, but rather stayed on board his ship Santa María. He saw several fires and canoes that showed Indians lived nearby, but they would all run and hide whenever Columbus’ ship came close. He continued traveling south along the coast, naming the different harbors and capes and trying to find Indians that would trade with him. On a few occasions Columbus did send men to explore the land. He even ventured onto the shore a couple times himself to see what the villages looked like. On these few occasions, Columbus did meet with some of the natives and, after their fear of the Spaniards subsided, they traded with the sailors. Columbus also inquired about the surrounding area and islands. Columbus described in his log the land as being exceedingly beautiful with lush forests and deep waters. He painted a picture of the natives as both a strong and meek people. They all walked around naked without any shame and ranged from dark tan to white in color. Columbus described each group he met as being the handsomest he has found.

== The Bay of Arrows according to Columbus ==
The Bay of Arrows is the inlet in the Samaná Peninsula where in his first voyage to the Americas the admiral had the last of these encounters with the natives, which differently from the previous ones, turned sour. According to Columbus's log, he anchored next to an islet in a bay near Isla Española on January 13, 1493, and immediately sent men to shore to meet with the natives, who happened to be the Cigüayos. Columbus' men went ashore and after some trading convinced one of the men to accompany them back to the ship to talk to Columbus. Upon meeting the Cigüayo, Columbus came to the conclusion the man was one of the Caribs. According to what Columbus had been able to decipher from conversations with other Indigenous people, the Taínos greatly feared the Caribs because of their warlike and cannibalistic practices. Columbus and the Cigüayo talked about the surrounding region, and the native told him about the all-female island of Matinino as well as many surrounding islands known for their sources of gold. Columbus also offered him with food and gifts, including cloth and glass beads. Columbus then had seven of his men return to the island to bring back the native leader and trade more with the island's inhabitants. Upon arrival, it was noticed that "upwards of fifty savages armed with bows and arrows, war-clubs, and javelins" were waiting in the tree line. There was no immediate skirmish however, and trading began smoothly between the islanders and the Europeans. Columbus's men were interested in trading for bows and arrows to bring back to Spain as artifacts of the New World, and possibly to disarm them in case a clash would occur. The atmosphere was obviously tense. The Spaniards were tired and anxious to go home, but more importantly, worried about Indigenous people with arrows. The Cigüayos were also apprehensive of these visitors, and on the defensive.

The trade began and the Cigüayos traded a couple of their weapons to the Europeans without any problems. Suddenly, for reasons still not completely known, the Cigüayos "ran to get their bows and arrows where they had laid them and returned with cords in their hands to bind the men". What ensued was a brief skirmish between the seven Spaniards and the roughly 50 armed Cigüayos. The Indians pushed towards the Spaniards and were pushed back almost immediately. Columbus's personal logs state that one native received "a great cut on the buttocks" and another was "shot in the breast with an arrow". The natives immediately scattered and ran, some dropping their weapons and ammunition in the process. Most of Columbus' men wanted to pursue the natives in their retreat and defeat them fully. The commander of the seven man crew ordered them to return to the ship and report the events to their admiral. None of Columbus' men suffered any injury in the skirmish.

== The Bay of Arrows according to Irving ==
Irving starts out the story of the Bay of Arrows almost identically to Columbus. He writes "They parted with two of their bows; but, suddenly conceiving some distrust, or thinking to overpower this handful of strangers, they rushed to the place where they had left their weapons, snatched them up . . ." This is not overly imaginative and rather looks like it could be plagiarism. Irving does, however go on to make quite a few assumptions. In fact, Irving writes another page and a half on the Natives of the island. He goes on to say, "This frank and confiding conduct, so indicative of a brave and generous nature, was properly appreciated by Columbus; he received the cacique cordially". Columbus, however, makes no mention of this sort in his logs. He makes very little mention of the Indians at all. The dominant bulk of his entry while moored in the bay is spent talking about the possibility of gold on the island and the exploitation thereof. Irving also makes assumptions about the nature of the Indians. He frequently refers to them as a mountaineering and brave people. Irving also assumes they are an amiable people who traded at length with Columbus. The facts for this are also absent in the primary source. Irving states, "Columbus remained a day or two longer in the bay, during which time the most friendly intercourse prevailed with the natives, who brought cotton, and various fruits and vegetables, but still maintained their warrior character, being always armed with bows and arrows". Columbus makes no mention in his log of their warrior character or of extensive trading with the Indians while in the bay. The log of Columbus does mention, however, that the bows were made of fairly light materials and that the style of shooting was not overly deadly and didn’t make too much of an impact on future decisions to come to the island. Irving goes on to say that Columbus leaves on good terms with the Indians. There is no evidence to support this in the log of Columbus either. It is known that Columbus did take four young Indians with him to Spain from this location and that they did provide him with helpful information but it does not say that the Indians were overly fond of him as Irving suggests. It is known that Columbus leaves due to the lack of opportunity left for him at the Bay of Arrows. His log seems to show he is ashamed of how he and his men treated the Natives at the bay. Columbus' log calls the way they treated the Indians "shameful".

== Misconceptions of name and location ==
The last mention in this immediate part of Irving's book states that the bay was named after this encounter. Columbus makes no mention of the Bay of Arrows being named for the skirmish that resulted of his failed attempt to trade for weapons of the Indians. It would seem more likely by reading Columbus's log that the Bay of Arrows is named after the chance to study the weapons brandished by the Indians. Several historians (including Washington Irving and Samuel Morison) thought the location of Columbus’ encounter at the Bay of Arrows was in the modern day Bay of Samaná. By the account of Washington Irving in his 1850 work The Life and Voyages of Christopher Columbus, "he gave the name of Golfos de las Flechas, or the Gulf of Arrows, but which is now known by the name of the Gulf of Samana". Morison also believed that the Bay of Arrows was located in the Bay of Samaná, but some historians disagree.

== Robert Fuson's argument ==
According to Irving and Morison the Bay of Arrows is the present day Gulf of Samaná. Since the time Irving's book this was widely accepted. Robert Fuson wrote an annotated translation of the log of Christopher Columbus entitled The Log of Christopher Columbus. In this translation Fuson suggests that Irving and Morison misplaced the Bay of Arrows. Instead of the larger Gulf of Samaná he suggests that Columbus actually visited the smaller Bay of Rincón just to the north of the Gulf of Samaná. He gives evidence such as the size of the Bay of Rincón being comparable to that of the bay described in Columbus's log. Fuson also mentions a small island at the mouth of the bay that is similar to Columbus' log. The evidence seems to favor Fuson in claim that Bay of Rincon is actually the real sight of the Bay of Arrows, not the commonly believed Gulf of Samaná.

== Conclusions ==
Irving would have us believe that Columbus got along famously with the Indians at Golfo de Las Flechas. In fact it would seem that Columbus did not return to the bay for any significant amount of time after this first one. The only mentions he makes of going back are mentions of stopping through on his way to the fortress at Navidad. It would appear that he felt the bay had no significance. It would seem that Irving's overactive imagination, while entertaining and patriotic was merely a grand illusion of the way the discovery of America ought to have been. We can also see this notion of an attempt to make things seem bigger than they are by Irving's placement of the bay. It is at the very least ironic that he makes the story larger and seem more significant than it may be, while also placing it in a larger and more significant location geographically. While the debate still rages on the bulk of the evidence does point towards Fuson being correct meaning the actual skirmish would have happened in what is present day Bay of Rincón.

== Bibliography ==
- Dunn, Oliver and James Kelly. The Diario of Christopher Columbus's First Voyage to America 1492–1493, University of Oklahoma Press. Norman and London pp. 333–343
- Fuson, Robert. The Log of Christopher Columbus. Camden, Maine. International Marine 1987
- Irving, Washington, The Life and Voyages of Christopher Columbus, New York and London. The Co-operative Publication Society, Inc. pp. 185–187
- Morison, Samuel E.. Admiral of the Ocean Sea. V. 1, New York: Time, Inc., 1962.
- Vega, Bernardo (1992). La verdadera ubicación del Golfo de las Flechas. Santo Domingo: Fundación Cultural Dominicana.
