= Book of Privileges =

1502 book by Christopher Columbus

The Book of Privileges (in Spanish, El Libro de los Privilegios) is a book written by explorer Christopher Columbus and completed in 1502, shortly before Columbus's fourth and final voyage to the Americas.

The book, prepared in Seville with the assistance of judges and notaries, is intended to detail and document all of the favors which Columbus believed were owed to him and to his heirs by the Spanish crown, as rewards for what he believed was the successful discovery of a new route to the East Indies, as well as the conquest and Christianization of new lands brought under the dominion of Spain.

The publication of the book was followed by the protracted legal battles between Columbus's family and the Spanish crown, known as the pleitos colombinos.

The book also contains a document in which Columbus refers to the New World as the Indias Occidentales ('West Indies'), which he says "were unknown to all the world", seeming to imply that he knew he had found a new continent.

== See also ==
- Capitulations of Santa Fe
- Pleitos colombinos
- Book of Prophecies
