= Trans-Atlantic trade =

International trade system

Trans-Atlantic trade refers to trade that involves African, Asian and Latin American economies' mercantile interactions with the Western World. It is typically distinct from the Trans-Atlantic slave trade, which is generally understood to be of a different era and range of goods sold.

Transnational corporations of the 19th and 20th century feature prominently in this trade, and in many parts of the world it has considerably weakened many historic long-distance trade systems, like the famous Silk Road trade in Asia or the Trans-Sahara trade route systems in Africa. Most of the products traded in Trans-Atlantic trade were and are made in Europe. The transnational corporations, many based in developing countries, created distribution channels of finished products and flooded their markets. Trans-Atlantic trade also includes exports of raw materials to Europe for manufacturing purposes.
