= Colombo (surname) =

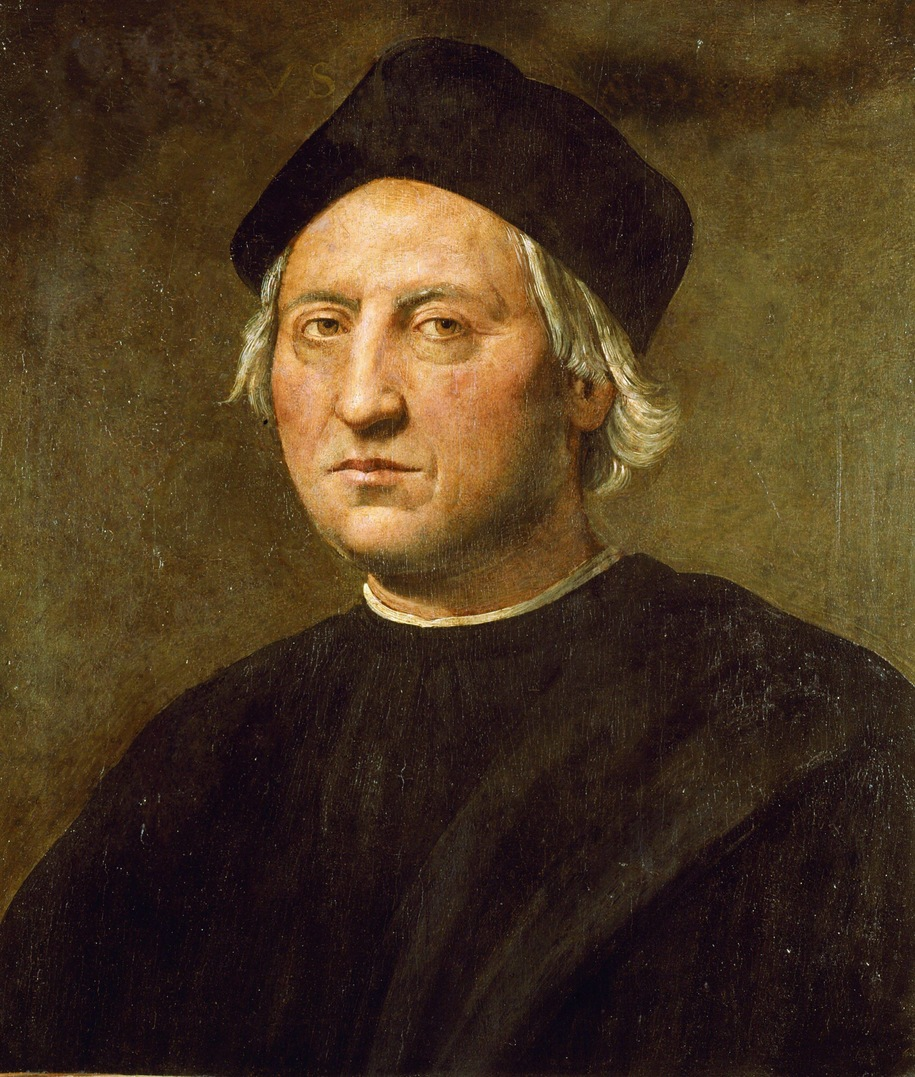
- Christopher Columbus (Italian: Cristoforo Colombo)
- Pronunciation: IPA: [koˈlombo]; IPA: [ˈkoləᵐbə]

Origin
- Languages: Italian; Sinhala
- Region of origin: Italy; Sri Lanka

Other names
- Variant form: Columbus

Colombo is an Italian surname. It was given to orphans.

== Geographical distribution ==
As of 2014, 66.9% of all known bearers of the surname Colombo were residents of Italy (frequency 1:458), 11.3% of Brazil (1:9,111), 7.2% of Argentina (1:2,986), 3.7% of the United States (1:48,838), 3.5% of Sri Lanka (1:2,965), 2.0% of France (1:16,850) and 1.1% of Venezuela (1:13,971).

In Italy, the frequency of the surname was higher than the national average (1:458) only in one region: Lombardy (1:85).

== People ==
- Achille Colombo Clerici, Italian lawyer, jurist, author, and community leader
- Adolfo Colombo (1868–1953), the most recorded singer in Cuba up to 1925
- Alain Colombo (born 1961), former French professional footballer
- Alberto Colombo (racing driver) (born 1946), former Italian racing driver
- Alfredo Colombo (1921–?), retired Italian professional football player
- Andrea Colombo (born 1974), Italian 100 metres sprinter
- Andrés Gerardo Colombo (born 1987), Argentine footballer
- Angelo Colombo (born 1961), former Italian footballer
- Angelo Martino Colombo (1935–2014), Italian professional football player
- Armando Colombo, German engineer
- Arrigo Colombo (1916–1998), Italian film producer
- Augusto Colombo (1902–1969), Italian painter
- Bartolomeo Colombo (c. 1461–1515), Italian explorer
- Camila Colombo (born 1990), Uruguayan chess player
- Charles Martin Colombo (1920–1986), American soccer player
- Christine Colombo Nilsen (born 1982), Norwegian football goalkeeper
- Chrystian Colombo (born 1952), Argentine businessman and politician
- Claude Colombo (born 1960), French professional football referee
- Corrado Colombo (born 1979), Italian footballer
- Cristoforo Colombo, the Italian language name of Italian explorer Christopher Columbus (c. 1451–1506)
- Domenico Colombo (Genoese: Domenego Corombo) (1418–1496), the father of navigator Christopher
- Eduardo A. Folle Colombo (1922–1994), Uruguayan basketball player
- Emilio Colombo (1920–2013), Prime Minister of Italy 1970–1972 and subsequently lifetime Senator
- Eugenio Colombo (born 1953), Italian saxophonist and flautist
- Federico Colombo (born 1987), Italian professional golfer
- Felice Colombo (born 1937), Italian businessman, past chairman of A.C. Milan (1977–80)
- Felipe Colombo Eguía (born 1983), Mexican-Argentine actor
- Filippo Colombo (born 1997), Swiss cross-country cyclist
- Franco Ermanno Colombo (1917–?), Italian professional football player
- Furio Colombo (1931–2025), Italian journalist and politician, editor-in-chief of L'Unità
- Gabriel Barcia-Colombo, American video artist
- Gabriele Colombo (born 1972), Italian road bicycle racer
- Gherardo Colombo (born 1946), Italian magistrate
- Giacomo Colombo (1663–1730), Italian sculptor, painter and engraver in the late 17th century and early 18th century in Naples.
- Gianni Colombo (1933–1993), Italian artist, member of the kinetic art movement
- Gioacchino Colombo (1903–1988), Italian automobile engine designer
- Giovanni Colombo (1902–1992), Cardinal and Archbishop of Milan
- Giovanni Battista Innocenzo Colombo (1717–1801), Swiss painter and stage set designer.
- Giuseppe Colombo (1920–1984), Italian mathematician, nicknamed "Bepi"
- Guilherme Colombo (born 1986), Brazilian politician
- Horacio Colombo (born 1934), Argentine former basketball player
- Ignacio Colombo (born 1995), Argentinian football forward
- Joe Cesare Colombo (1930–1971), Italian industrial designer
- John Robert Colombo (born 1936), Canadian author
- Joseph Anthony "Joe" Colombo Sr. (1923–1978), the boss of the Colombo crime family
- Julio Colombo (born 1984), French retired football defender
- Jürgen Colombo (born 1949), German track cyclist
- Kaitlin Colombo, American stand-up comedian, television personality, writer and actress
- Laurent del Colombo (born 1959), French judoka
- Lorenzo Colombo (born 2002), Italian footballer
- Maria Luisa Colombo (born 1952), Italian singer, best known as Lu Colombo
- Luca Colombo (cyclist) (born 1969), Italian racing cyclist
- Luca Colombo (footballer) (born 1944), Italian centre-back football player
- Luigi Colombo, Italian artist
- Marc Colombo (born 1978), former American football offensive tackle
- Marcelo Daniel Colombo (born 1961), Argentine Roman Catholic bishop of La Rioja since 2013
- Marco Colombo (born 1960), Italian swimmer
- Maria Colombo (disambiguation), multiple people
- Martín Colombo Rivero (born 1985), Uruguayan footballer
- Nazareno Fernández Colombo (born 1997), Argentine professional footballer
- Nicola Colombo (1968–2026), Italian businessman, chairman of A.C. Monza Brianza
- Paolo Andrea Colombo (born 1960), Italian business executive
- Pia Colombo (1934–1986), French singer of Franco-Italian origin
- Raimundo Colombo (born 1955), Brazilian politician and member of the Social Democratic Party
- Realdo Colombo (c. 1515 – 1559), Italian anatomist and surgeon
- Riccardo Colombo (born 1982), Italian football defender
- Roberto Colombo (footballer) (born 1975), retired Italian football goalkeeper
- Roberto Colombo (motorcyclist) (1927–1957), Italian Grand Prix motorcycle racer
- Rodrigo Jesús Colombo (born 1992), Argentine professional football defender
- Scipio Colombo (1910–2002), Italian dramatic baritone
- Simone Colombo (born 1963), former professional tennis player from Italy
- Ugo Colombo (real estate developer) (born 1961), Italian-born residential and commercial real estate developer in Miami
- Umberto Colombo (athlete) (1880–?), Italian track and field athlete
- Umberto Colombo (footballer) (1933–2021), retired Italian professional football midfielder
- Umberto Colombo (scientist) (1927–2006), Italian scientist
- Virginio Colombo (1885–1927), a prolific Italian architect later active in Buenos Aires
- Vittorino Colombo (1925–1996), Italian Christian Democrat politician
- Colombo crime family of New York
  - Joseph Colombo (1923–1978), its namesake

== Football (soccer) players ==
- Angelo Colombo (born 1961), Italian midfielder
- Charlie Colombo (1920–1986), American defender
- Corrado Colombo (born 1979), Italian striker
- Julio Colombo (born 1984), French (Guadeloupean) defender
- Luca Colombo (footballer) (born 1984), Italian defender
- Riccardo Colombo (born 1982), Italian defender
- Roberto Colombo (footballer) (born 1975), Italian goalkeeper

== See also ==
- Columbus (disambiguation)
- Columbo (TV series)
- Coulomb (disambiguation)
- Colón (disambiguation)
