= Columbus =

Columbus is a Latinized version of the Italian surname "Colombo". It most commonly refers to:

- Christopher Columbus (1451–1506), the Italian explorer
- Columbus, Ohio, the capital city of the U.S. state of Ohio

Columbus may also refer to:

== Places ==
=== Extraterrestrial ===
- Columbus (crater), a crater on Mars
- Columbus (ISS module), the European module for the International Space Station
- Columbus (spacecraft), a program to develop a European space station 1986–1991

=== Italy ===
- Columbus (Rome), a residential district

=== United States ===
- Columbus, Arkansas
- Columbus, Georgia
- Columbus, Illinois
- Columbus, Indiana, known for modern architecture
  - ColumBUS, the public transit operator for the city in Indiana
- Columbus, Kansas
- Columbus, Kentucky
- Columbus, Minnesota
- Columbus, Mississippi
- Columbus, Missouri
- Columbus, Montana
- Columbus, Nebraska
- Columbus, New Jersey
- Columbus, New Mexico
- Columbus, New York
- Columbus, North Carolina
- Columbus, North Dakota
- Columbus, Ohio
- Columbus, Texas
- Columbus, Wisconsin
- Columbus (town), Wisconsin
- Columbus Avenue (disambiguation)
- Columbus Circle, a traffic circle in Manhattan, New York
- Columbus City (disambiguation)
- Columbus Township (disambiguation)

== Persons with the name ==
=== Forename ===
- Columbus Caldwell (1830–1908), American politician
- Columbus Germain (1827–1880), American politician
- Columbus Short (born 1982), American choreographer and actor

=== Surname ===
- Bartholomew Columbus (c. 1461–1515), Christopher Columbus' younger brother
- Chris Columbus (filmmaker) (born 1958), American filmmaker
- Diego Columbus (1479/80–1526), Christopher Columbus' eldest son
- Ferdinand Columbus (1488–1539), Christopher Columbus' second son
- Scott Columbus (1956–2011), long-time drummer for the heavy metal band Manowar

== Arts, entertainment, and media ==
=== Films ===
- Columbus (2015 film), an Indian comedy, subtitled "Discovering Love"
- Columbus (2017 film), an American drama set amidst the architecture of Columbus, Indiana
- Columbus (Star Trek), a shuttlecraft in the Star Trek series

=== Music ===
==== Opera ====
- Columbus (Egk), German-language opera by Egk, 1943
- Columbus, 1855 opera by František Škroup
- Christophe Colomb, French-language opera by Milhaud often referred to as Columbus in English sources

==== Other uses in music ====
- Columbus (Herzogenberg), large scale cantata by Heinrich von Herzogenberg 1870
- Columbus: Images for Orchestra, orchestral composition by Leonardo Balada 1991
- "Colombus", song by Mary Black from No Frontiers
- "Columbus" (song), a song by the band Kent from their album Tillbaka till samtiden

=== Other uses in arts, entertainment, and media ===
- Columbus (novel), a 1941 novel about Christopher Columbus by Rafael Sabatini
- Columbus (Bartholdi), a statue depicting Christopher Columbus by Frédéric Auguste Bartholdi, in Providence, Rhode Island, US
- Columbus Edwards, the character known as Lum of Lum and Abner

== Brands and enterprises ==
- Columbus (software), ab initio quantum chemistry software
- ColumBus, former name of Howard Transit in Howard County, Maryland
- Columbus Communications, a cable television and broadband speed Internet service provider in the Caribbean region
- Columbus Salame, an American food processing company
- Columbus Tubing, an Italian manufacturer of bicycle frame tubing
- Columbus Buggy Company, an American automotive manufacturer from 1875 to 1913

== Ships ==
- Columbus (1824), a disposable ship built to transport lumber from North America to Britain
- MS Columbus, a cruise ship owned by Plantours & Partner GmbH
- MV Columbus, a cruise ship owned by Seajets
- SS Christopher Columbus, Great Lakes excursion liner (1893–1933)
- SS City of Columbus, a passenger steamer that sailed from Boston to Savannah and sank off Martha's Vineyard in 1884
- SS Columbus (1873), an American merchantman converted in 1878 into the Russian cruiser Asia
- SS Columbus (1924), a transatlantic ocean liner for the North German Lloyd steamship line
- USS Columbus, various ships of the US Navy

== Other uses ==
- Columbus hops, a variety of hops
- Generation of Columbuses, a generation of Poles born ca. 1920, who had to fight twenty years later
- Columbus (shopping centre), a shopping centre in Vuosaari, Helsinki, Finland

== See also ==
- Christopher Columbus (disambiguation)
- Columbus City Hall (disambiguation)
- Columba
- Columbia (disambiguation)
- Columbus Day
- List of places named for Christopher Columbus
