= Christopher Columbus in fiction =

Christopher Columbus was an Italian explorer and navigator who completed four voyages across the Atlantic Ocean, opening the way for European exploration and colonization of the Americas. His expeditions, sponsored by the Catholic Monarchs of Spain, were the first European contact with the Caribbean, Central America, and South America. He has been represented in many fictional and semi-fictional works, including plays, operas, films and TV, as well as literary works.

== Pre-20th century ==
- 1592 – Lope de Vega, El Nuevo Mundo descubierto por Cristóbal Colón
- 1690 – Alessandro Scarlatti Il Colombo ovvera L'India scoperta
- 1828 – A History of the Life and Voyages of Christopher Columbus, a biographical fiction written by Washington Irving.
- 1892 – Cristoforo Colombo, an Italian opera by Alberto Franchetti

== 1900–1950 ==
- 1904 - Christopher Columbus, a short silent film by Vincent Lorant-Heilbronn (fr)
- 1910 – Christopher Columbus, a short silent film by Etienne Arnaud
- 1912 - The Coming of Columbus by Colin Campbell
- 1916 - Christophe Colomb by Gerard Bourgeois
- 1922 - Christopher Columbus by Edwyn L. Hollywood
- 1923 – Christopher Columbus, a German silent historical film directed by Márton Garas and starring Albert Bassermann and Elsa Bassermann
- 1929 – Christophe Colomb, play by Michel de Ghelderode
- 1930 – Christophe Colomb, opera by Darius Milhaud based on Claudel's 1927 play
- 1932 – Walter Hasenclever and Kurt Tucholsky's play Christoph Kolumbus oder Die Entdeckung Amerikas (TV version 1969)
- 1933 – Le Livre de Christophe Colomb by Paul Claudel, after his libretto for Milhaud
- 1941 – Columbus, a romantic adventure novel by the British writer Rafael Sabatini
- 1945 – Where Do We Go from Here?, starring Fortunio Bonanova as Christopher Columbus
- 1949 – Christopher Columbus, a British film starring Fredric March as Christopher Columbus and Florence Eldridge as Queen Isabella I of Castile

== 1950–1990 ==
- 1951 – Dawn of America, a Spanish historical adventure film directed by Juan de Orduña and starring António Vilar, María Martín and José Suárez
- 1951 – Hare We Go, a cartoon starring Bugs Bunny as a mascot aboard Columbus's first voyage.
- 1957 – The Story of Mankind, starring Anthony Dexter as Christopher Columbus
- 1977 – Christophorus Goofy Columbus, a comic starring Goofy, Mickey Mouse and other Disney characters was first published in a number of European countries. It, however, has so far only ever been published in English in the UK.
- 1979 El arpa y la sombra (trans. The Harp and the Shadow), novel by Alejo Carpentier
- 1985 – Christopher Columbus, a biographical television miniseries directed by Alberto Lattuada and starring Gabriel Byrne
- 1987 – The Memoirs of Christopher Columbus, a fictional autobiography written by Stephen Marlowe, winner the French Prix Gutenberg du Livre award in 1988

== 1990s ==
- 1992, February - The Magic Voyage, a German animated fantasy film
- 1992, August - Christopher Columbus: The Discovery, a film starring Marlon Brando and Catherine Zeta-Jones
- 1992, October – 1492: Conquest of Paradise, a film directed by Ridley Scott, and starring Gérard Depardieu and Sigourney Weaver
- 1992, October – The Voyage, an opera by the American composer Philip Glass
- 1992, October – Carry On Columbus, a comedy film starring Jim Dale, Maureen Lipman, Bernard Cribbins, Leslie Phillips, June Whitfield and Alexei Sayle
- 1992 – The Man Who Rowed Christopher Columbus Ashore, a short story by Harlan Ellison, and winner of the 1994 Nebula Award
- 1992 – Christopher Columbus, an Italian-Japanese animated series by Nippon Animation
- 1993, February – 1492, Teenage Mutant Ninja Turtles Adventures comic book issue where the turtles travel across the Caribbean Sea when a strange storm causes them to travel 500 years back in time, where they witness Christopher Columbus and his men arriving to America and a fight between the indigenous peoples and Christopher Columbus and his men breaks out.
- 1996 – Pastwatch: The Redemption of Christopher Columbus, a science fiction novel by Orson Scott Card

== 2000s ==
- 2006 – Apocalypto, an epic adventure film directed and produced by Mel Gibson
- 2009 – Assassin's Creed II: Discovery, a video game by Ubisoft
- 2013 – Trouble in Paradise, an audiobook produced by Big Finish Productions for the series Doctor Who: Destiny of the Doctor, featuring the sixth incarnation of the Doctor, where he learns that Columbus's discovery of America was 'aided' by a sentient super-intelligent bovine entity from an alternate timeline.
- 2016 – Assassin's Creed, a historical science fiction action film based on the video game series of the same name
- 2017 – Conquistadores: Adventvm, a Spanish historical drama miniseries directed by Israel del Santo that tells the story of the first 30 years of the colonization of the Americas.
- 2023 – Clone High, an American-Canadian adult animated science fiction sitcom, is set at a high school populated by the clones of well-known historical figures, including one of Christopher Columbus (voiced by Neil Casey). Adopting the name 'Topher Bus', he appears to be supportive of social movements and trends to distance himself from the historic Columbus.

== Unsorted ==
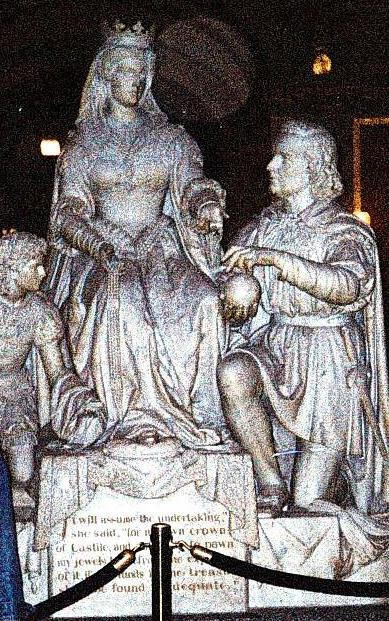
Isabella and Columbus by Larkin Mead under dome of California State Capitol

Columbus, an important historical figure, has been depicted in fiction, cinema and television, and in other media and entertainment, such as stage plays, music, cartoons and games.

In games

- Columbus appears as a Great Explorer in the strategy game Civilization Revolution.
- Columbus can be summoned as an assist character in Scribblenauts and its sequels.
- Columbus appears as a supporting character in the video game Assassin's Creed II: Discovery, voiced by Roger L. Jackson. The main protagonist, Ezio Auditore, must help Columbus launch his expedition which led to the discovery of the Americas, and protect him from the Templar Order, who are trying to prevent the voyage so that they will be the first to conquer the New World.
- Columbus appears as a Rider-class Servant in Fate/Grand Order. He is an antagonist in the Agartha chapter.

In literature

- Columbus before the University of Salamanca., a poem by Lydia Huntley Sigourney published in 1834.
- In 1889, American author Mark Twain based the time traveler's trick in A Connecticut Yankee in King Arthur's Court on Columbus' successful prediction of a lunar eclipse during his fourth voyage to the New World.
- "Columbus", a poem by Florence Earle Coates, was published in Harper's Weekly on 22 October 1892.
- In 1941 the British author Rafael Sabatini published a novel Columbus, based on a screenplay he had written for a planned film. The story provided the inspiration for the 1949 film about Columbus.
- In 1958, the Italian playwright Dario Fo wrote a satirical play about Columbus titled Isabella, tre caravelle e un cacciaballe (Isabella, three tall ships and a con man). In 1997 Fo was awarded the Nobel Prize in Literature. The play was translated into English in 1988 by Ed Emery and is downloadable on the internet.
- In 1991, author Salman Rushdie published a fictional representation of Columbus in The New Yorker, "Christopher Columbus and Queen Isabella of Spain Consummate Their Relationship, Santa Fe, January, 1492".
- In Pastwatch: The Redemption of Christopher Columbus (1996) science fiction novelist Orson Scott Card focuses on Columbus' life and activities, but the novel's action also deals with a group of scientists from the future who travel back to the 15th century with the goal of changing the pattern of European contact with the Americas.
- British author Stephen Baxter includes Columbus' quest for royal sponsorship as a crucial historical event in his 2007 science fiction novel Navigator (ISBN 978-0-441-01559-7), the third entry in the author's Time's Tapestry Series.
- American novelist Steve Berry's 2012 book The Columbus Affair revolves around the premise that Columbus' voyages held a secret purpose, with clues to an ancient Jewish treasure.
- MiBa'ad LaKarka'it HaShkufa, (English title Beyond the Transparent Bottom) an Israeli, Hebrew language novel by Yuval Shimoni, whose main character is a Jewish teenager who sails to the New World with Columbus, published in 2021 by Am Oved.

In music

- Christopher Columbus is regularly referred to by singers and musical groups in the Rastafari movement as an example of a European oppressor. The detractors include Burning Spear (Christopher Columbus), Culture (Capture Rasta), and Peter Tosh (You Can't Blame The Youth, Here Comes The Judge).
- Toward the end of "Bob Dylan's 115th Dream" (at 6:00 minute mark on "Bringing It All Back Home" album), a parody of US society in the 1960's, there is a comedy sequence "But the funniest thing was when I was leaving the bay; I spied three ships a sailing, they were all heading my way; I asked the captain what his name was and how come he didn't drive a truck; He said his name was Columbus, and I just said, 'Good luck.'"
- The Church's 1985 album Heyday contains the song "Columbus", where the singer (ostensibly taking the perspective of Queen Isabella) expresses regret at sponsoring the expedition.
- In June 2024, the Japanese rock band Mrs. Green Apple released a song and music video entitled "Columbus". However, the band's description of dressing up as Columbus, Napoleon and Ludwig van Beethoven and having an ape-like character pull a rickshaw in the music video was heavily criticised as racist and the band were forced to remove the music video from YouTube.

On screen

- 1922 Christoph Columbus (Márton Garas; Germany)
- 1923 Columbus (Edwin L. Hollywood; USA)
- 1924 Columbus and Isabella (Bryan Foy, American short)
- Columbus is played by Oswald the Lucky Rabbit in the 1934 cartoon Chris Columbus, Jr.
- Christopher Columbus is a 1949 British film starring Fredric March as Columbus.
- Dawn of America, a 1951 Spanish film with António Vilar as Columbus
- The 1985 TV mini-series Christopher Columbus features Gabriel Byrne as Columbus.
- Columbus was portrayed by Gérard Depardieu in the 1992 film by Ridley Scott, 1492: Conquest of Paradise. Scott presented Columbus as a forward-thinking idealist, as opposed to the view that he was ruthless and responsible for the misfortune of Native Americans.
- Carry On Columbus, a 1992 comedy.
- Christopher Columbus: The Discovery, a 1992 biographical film by Alexander Salkind.
- The 42nd episode of The Sopranos, titled "Christopher" (2002), addresses the controversies surrounding Columbus' legacy from the perspectives of numerous identity group members.
- Cristóvão Colombo - O Enigma is a 2007 film by Manoel de Oliveira in which the main character travels between America and Portugal trying to prove that Christopher Columbus was, in fact, Portuguese.
- In the 2006 film Night at the Museum, Pierfrancesco Favino plays a statue of Christopher Columbus at the American Museum of Natural History. Like other exhibits, Columbus comes to life every night due to the powers of an Egyptian artifact called the Golden Tablet of Ahkmenrah.
- Assassin's Creed is a 2016 film by Justin Kurzel based on the video game franchise with the same name. The main character, Aguilar de Nerha (portrayed by Michael Fassbender), entrusts Columbus (played by Gabriel Andreu) with a powerful artifact known as an Apple of Eden and requests that he take it to his grave.

In sculpture

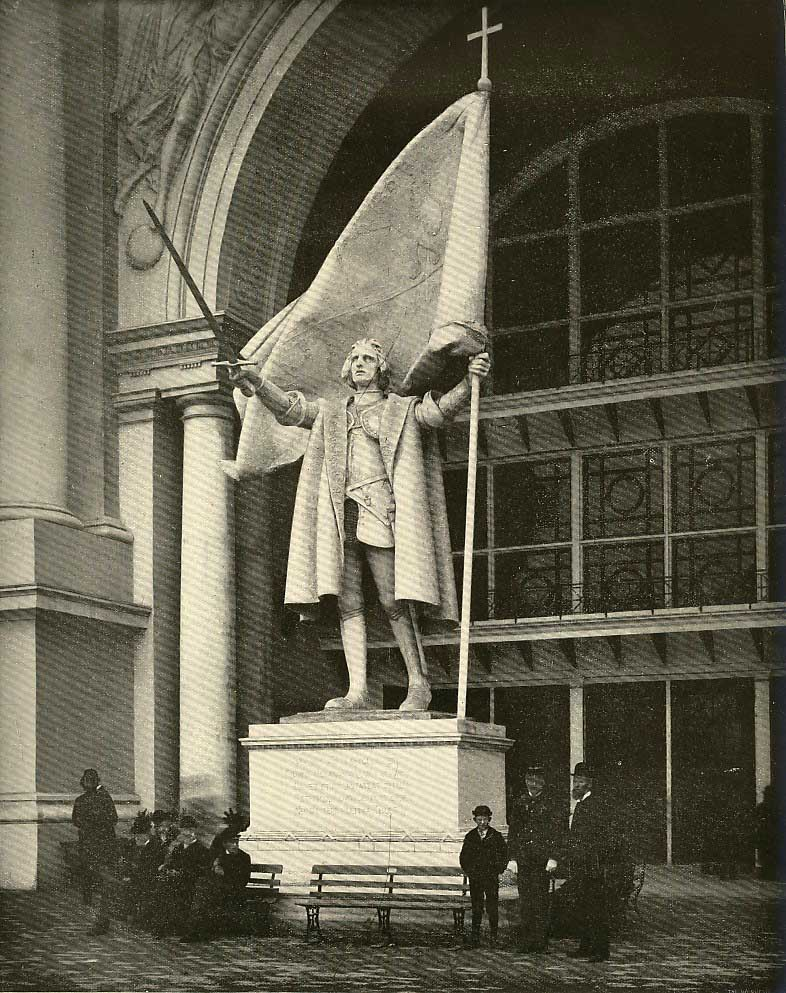
Columbus by Mary Lawrence

- Columbus Doors, 1871, in the United States Capitol in Washington, D.C.
- Isabella and Columbus by Larkin Mead, 1874, California State Capitol, Sacramento, California
- Monumento a Colón, 1877, in the Paseo de la Reforma, Mexico City
- Christopher Columbus, by Moses Jacob Ezekiel, Arrigo Park, Chicago. Illinois, 1891
- Drake Fountain, also known as the Columbus Monument by Richard Henry Park, Chicago, Illinois, 1892
- Christopher Columbus by Ferdinand von Miller the Younger, St. Louis, Missouri, 1884, This work is different from most in that it shows a bearded Columbus. It is believed to be the first bronze statue of Columbus in the United States.
- Colossal Columbus statue by Mary Lawrence, 1893, at the World's Columbian Exposition, Chicago, Illinois,
- Columbus by Paul Wayland Bartlett ca. 1895 Library of Congress, Washington D.C.
- Christopher Columbus Memorial by Pietro Piai 1904, Pueblo, Colorado. "Colorado was the first state to make Columbus Day a legal holiday in 1905 and this is reportedly the first monument to Columbus erected in the United States."
- Christopher Columbus, by Augusto Rivalta, Detroit, Michigan, 1910,
- Columbus Fountain, by Lorado Taft, 1912, Washington D.C.
- Christopher Columbus, by Virgil Rainer, Chicago, Illinois, 1924
- Christopher Columbus by Charles Brioschi, assisted by Leo Lentelli, St. Paul, Minnesota, 1931
- Statue of Christopher Columbus by Charles Brioschi, Grant Park, 1933
- Christopher Columbus, by Frank Vittor, Pittsburgh, Pennsylvania, 1958
- Christopher Columbus Monument by David W. Oswald, Columbus, Wisconsin, 1988

In space

- Asteroid 327 Columbia is named in his honour.
