= Christopher Columbus (disambiguation) =

Christopher Columbus (1451–1506) was an Italian explorer and navigator from the Republic of Genoa.

Christopher Columbus or Chris Columbus may also refer to:

== People ==
- Chris Columbus (musician) (1902–2002), American jazz drummer
- Chris Columbus (filmmaker) (born 1958), American director

== Artwork and monuments ==
- Christopher Columbus (Vittori), a 1920 public artwork in Indianapolis, Indiana by Enrico Vittori
- Statue of Christopher Columbus (Central Park), an 1892 statue in Central Park, Manhattan, New York by Jeronimo Suñol
- Statue of Christopher Columbus (Chicago), a 1933 statue in Chicago by Carlo Brioschi

== Film, radio and television ==
- Christopher Columbus (1904 film), a French silent film directed by Vincent Lorant-Heilbronn
- Christopher Columbus (1923 film), a German silent film directed by Márton Garas
- Christopher Columbus (play), a 1942 radio play by Louis MacNeice with music by William Walton
- Christopher Columbus (1943 film), a Mexican film directed by José Díaz Morales
- Christopher Columbus (1949 film), a British film directed by David MacDonald
- Christopher Columbus (miniseries), a 1985 television mini-series
- Christopher Columbus: The Discovery, a 1992 film by John Glen

== Opera and other musical works ==
- Christophe Colomb, a 1930 opera by Darius Milhaud
- Christopher Columbus (Zador), a 1939 opera by Eugene Zador
- Christopher Columbus, a 1976 opera by Don White for Opera Rara, see List of operettas by Jacques Offenbach#Pastiche
- "Christopher Columbus" (jazz song), a 1936 song co-written by Chu Berry and Andy Razaf and popularized by Fats Waller
- "Christopher Columbus" (A1 song) (2013)

== Other uses ==
- SS Christopher Columbus, an American excursion liner
- Christopher Columbus High School (Miami-Dade County), Florida
- Christopher Columbus High School (Bronx), New York
- Christopher Columbus, vol. III and IV of The Long Journey, a Danish novel series by Johannes V. Jensen

== People with the given names ==
- Christopher Columbus Andrews (1829–1922), American soldier, diplomat and author
- Christopher Columbus Kraft, Jr. (1924–2019), NASA's original Flight Director
- Christopher Columbus Langdell (1826–1906), Dean of Harvard Law School

== See also ==
- Chris Columbus, Jr., a 1934 short animated film
- CMA CGM Christophe Colomb, containership
- Columbus (disambiguation)
- Cristoforo Colombo (disambiguation)
