= Columbus micropolitan area =

The Columbus micropolitan area may refer to:

- The Columbus, Mississippi micropolitan area, United States
- The Columbus, Nebraska micropolitan area, United States

== See also ==
- Columbus metropolitan area (disambiguation)
- Columbus (disambiguation)
