= Columbus Day (disambiguation) =

Columbus Day is a national holiday in the United States of America.

Columbus Day may also refer to:

- Columbus Day (film), directed by Charles Burmeister
- Columbus Day storm of 1962, a storm which occurred in the Pacific Northwest

== See also ==
- Columbus (disambiguation)
