= Columbus Township, Michigan =

Columbus Township, Michigan may be one of the following places:

- Columbus Township, Luce County, Michigan
- Columbus Township, St. Clair County, Michigan

== See also ==
- Columbus Township (disambiguation)
