= NCC (company) =

Swedish construction company

NCC AB
- Type: Aktiebolag
- Traded as: Nasdaq Stockholm: NCC A, NCC B
- Industry: Construction
- Founded: 1988
- Headquarters: Solna, Stockholm, Sweden
- Key people: CEO Tomas Carl Georg Carlsson
- Products: Residential, commercial and infrastructure contracting, asphalt and stone materials production, commercial property development.
- Revenue: 62 billion SEK (2024)
- Number of employees: 11,800 (2024)
- Website: https://www.ncc.com/

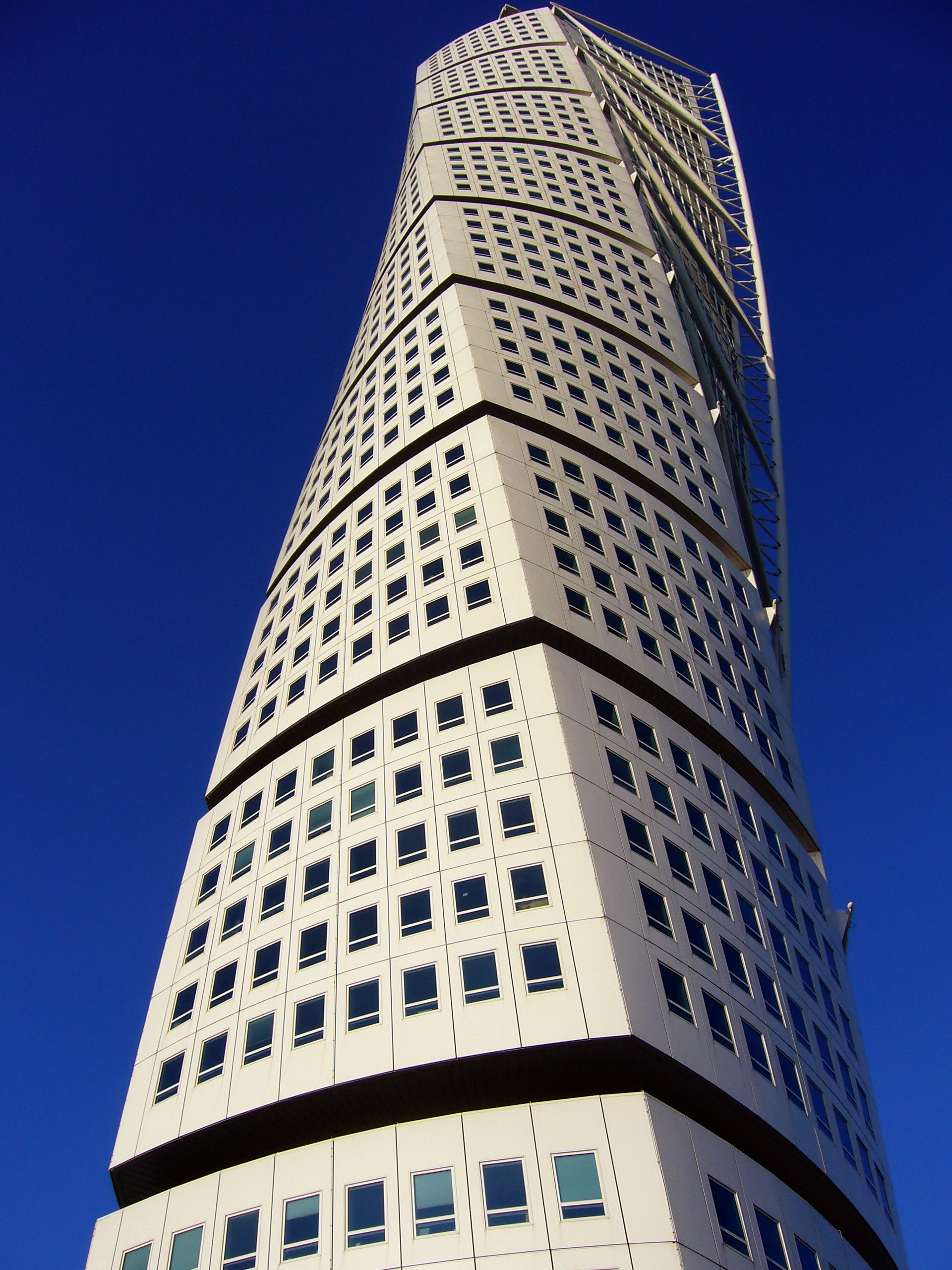
The Turning Torso, Malmo

NCC AB (Nordic Construction Company) is a Swedish construction company, one of the largest in the Nordic region with annual revenues (2024) of 62 billion SEK and about 11 800 employees.

NCC builds residential properties, industrial facilities and public buildings, roads, civil engineering structures and other types of infrastructure. NCC also offers input materials used in construction, such as aggregates and asphalt, and conducts paving. Operations also include commercial property development.

NCC conducts operations in the Nordic region. Among its biggest competitors are AF Gruppen, Skanska, Peab, Per Aarsleff, Veidekke and YIT.

Alf Göransson is chairman of the board of NCC and Tomas Carlsson is president and CEO since 2018.

== History ==
NCC's historical roots go back to 1875, when Nya Asfalt AB was founded. The company would later form the foundation of NCC and played an important role in the development of operations in paving and infrastructure.

In late 1987, Nordstjernan AB began acquiring shares in the listed construction company Armerad Betong Vägförbättringar (ABV). At the time, Nordstjernan had its own construction company called Johnson Construction Company (JCC).

In spring 1988, Nordstjernan increased its shareholding in the company and, by May 21, 1988, ABV was considered a Nordstjernan subsidiary. At the company's annual general meeting on June 8, then President of JCC, Torsten Eriksson, was also appointed president of ABV.

On June 9, 1988, the president sent a letter containing information about the merger and upcoming integration to the company's 20,000 employees and to 30,000 business contacts.

Work on the new organization was largely completed by September 8, when 475 managers were appointed and a Group structure was established. Company president Torsten Eriksson settled the question concerning the location of the head office of NCC, as the joint company was to be called, when he selected ABV's head office on Vallgatan in Solna. Four days later, Nordstjernan was listed on the stock exchange.

On September 20, 1988, Nordstjernan acquired all of the shares in NCC from JCC, upon which the construction operations of JCC and ABV were transferred to NCC.

Following the acquisition, JCC became a subsidiary of NCC and changed its name to NCC Bygg AB. Although the NCC Group was legally formed on January 1, 1989, JCC and ABV have been assembled under a single roof and a shared logo since October 15, 1988, when a joint graphic profile was launched.

NCC Housing was a part of NCC up until 2016 and was divested into Bonava.

== Business areas ==
=== NCC Infrastructure ===
NCC builds infrastructure for travel, transportation, energy and water throughout the Nordic region.

=== NCC Building Sweden ===
NCC constructs housing, offices and public and commercial premises in Sweden.

=== NCC Building Nordics ===
NCC Building Nordics constructs housing and offices for both public and private customers in Denmark, Finland and Norway.

=== NCC Industry ===
NCC Industry focuses on production of stone materials and asphalt as well as foundation work and asphalt paving.

=== NCC Property Development ===
NCC Property Development develops and sells commercial properties in defined growth markets in the Nordic countries.

=== NCC Green Industry Transformation ===
NCC Green Industry Transformation brings together resources, expertise and projects from across NCC to run major projects related to the green industrial transition.

== Sustainability ==
NCC has the target to become climate neutral by 2045. The company is also working to reduce carbon emissions in the value chain.

== Projects ==
=== Turning Torso ===
Turning Torso is located by the sea, within walking distance from the beach and the heart of downtown Malmö. When it opened its doors for occupancy in the spring of 2005, the spectacular building stood at a height of 190 meters, with a total of 54 stories.

The building comprises about 15,000 square meters of floor space and contains 147 rental apartments. It also houses 4,200 square meters of office space. Other facilities include overnight rooms, saunas and exercise facilities, an observation gallery, party facilities, a wine cellar and office modules. The property is equipped with district heating and cooling, featuring individual consumption measurement.

=== The Vasa Museum ===
Four years after the building start and 362 years after the Vasa Ship sank, the Vasa Museum was inaugurated on the June 15, 1990. The Vasa Museum is today Scandinavia's most visited museum. Surrounding the ship are several permanent exhibitions, cinemas, a shop and a restaurant.

The museum was designed by Månsson Dahlbäck Arkitektkontor and built by NCC. (Note: More about the project)

=== Kista Science Tower ===
Kista Science Tower in Kista, Stockholm is the second tallest building in Sweden, at a height of 117.2 metres (385 ft). It was completed in 2003.

=== The Øresund link ===
The Øresund link, which is 16 kilometers long, is one of Scandinavia's most important infrastructural achievements to date. It consists of three sections: a tunnel, a bridge and a manmade island that links together the tunnel and the bridge in the middle of the Öresund Strait. The bridge starts in Sweden and the tunnel in Denmark. NCC led the Øresund Tunnel Contractors, the international consortium that built the 3.7-kilometer-long Øresund Tunnel.

=== Road tunnels in Faroe Islands ===
NCC has constructed three subsea road tunnels in the Faroe Island, of which Eysturoyartunnilin is the latest complete and links the island of Streymoy to the island of Eysturoy. It includes the world's first undersea roundabout in the middle of the network. A fourth tunnel, the Sandoyartunnilin, was opened on 21 December 2023.

=== Dresdner Hof ===
Opening on 26 January 1990, the Dresdner Hof, which was built by ABV following its merger with Johnson Construction Company in 1988, was one of the last Stasi controlled foreign exchange hotels built in East Germany. Today, it is called the Hilton Dresden.
