= Luca Colombo =

Luca Colombo may refer to:

- Luca Colombo (footballer)
- Luca Colombo (cyclist)
