= Columbus (shopping centre) =

Shopping centre in Helsinki, Finland

Coordinates: 60°12′27″N 25°08′41″E

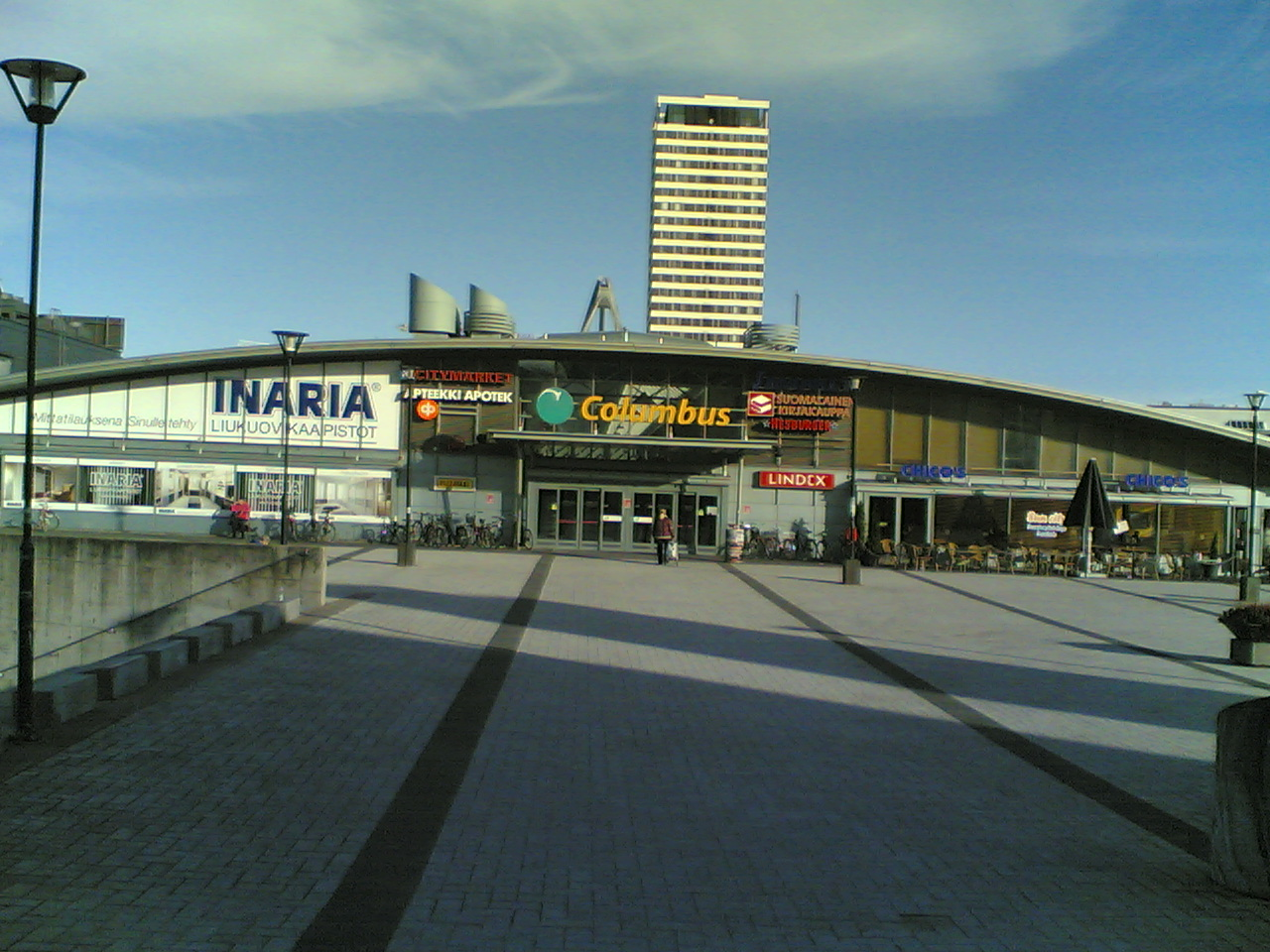
The Columbus shopping centre in 2014

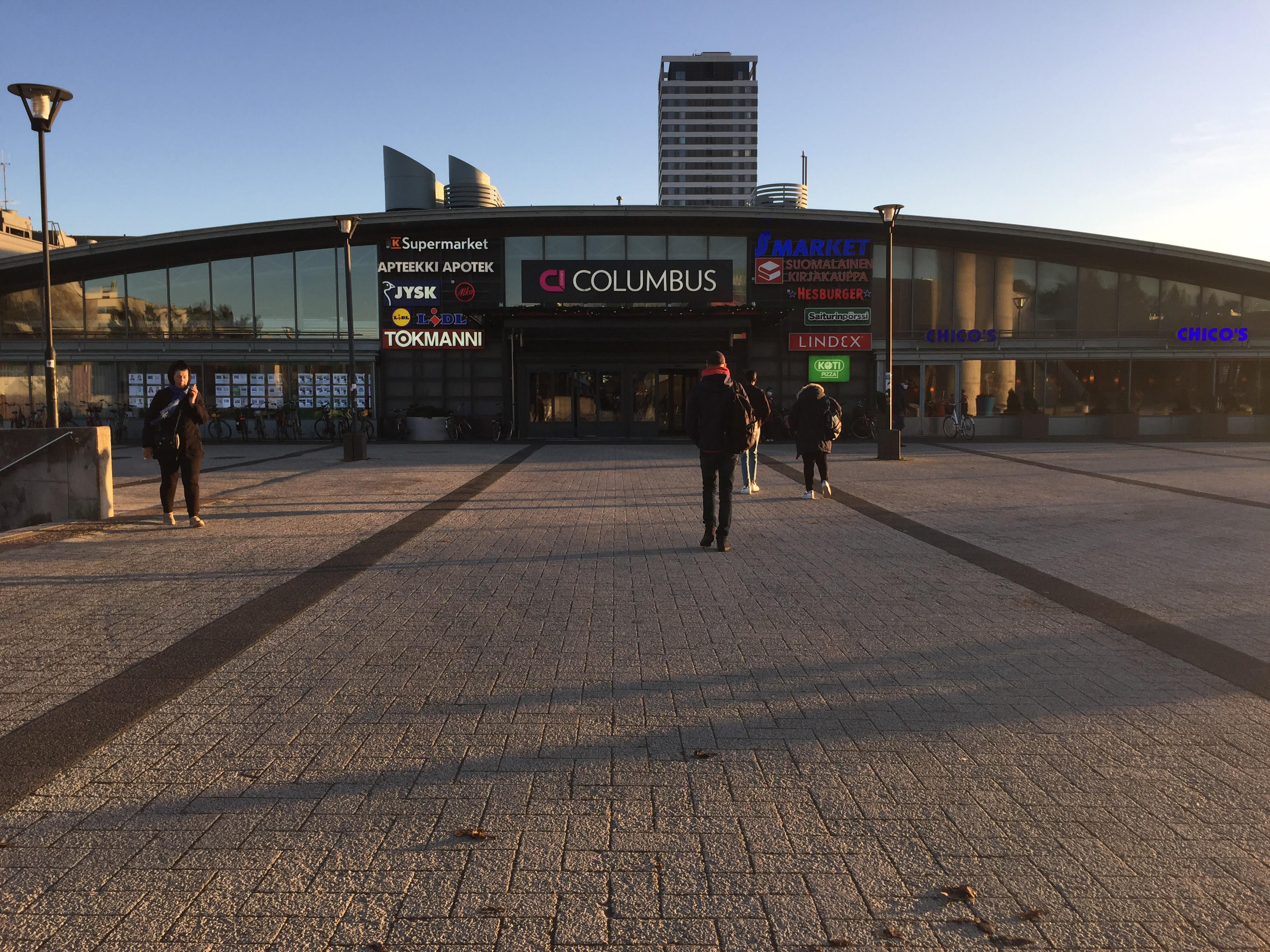
The columbus shopping centre in November 2020

Columbus is a shopping centre in Vuosaari, Helsinki, Finland, right next to the Vuosaari metro station. It is owned by Citycon. The centre was completed in August 1996. The centre has a total surface area of over 20,000 m^{2} (220,000 sq ft).

To the north of the shopping centre are located the Mosaiikkitori square and the Vuotalo cultural centre as well as the Vuosaari sports hall, and to the south of it are located the service centre Albatrossi and Cirrus, the highest residential building in Finland, which was completed in 2006.

== History ==
=== The Paulig era (1996-2006) ===
The family company Paulig known for its coffee and spices owned land at the centre of Vuosaari. During the early 1990s depression in Finland, the company started building business spaces in the area by itself as it could not find any suitable investors.

The shopping centre was completed in autumn 1996, almost two years before the Vuosaari branch of the Helsinki metro and its three stations (Puotila, Rastila and Vuosaari) were put into use. Because of its small size, the centre was slightly overshadowed by larger shopping centres, so it was expanded to the east by about 7,000 m^{2} (75,000 sq ft).

The expansion was started in June 2005 and was completed at Christmas 2006. With the expansion, the total surface area of the centre grew to over 20,000 m^{2} (220,000 sq ft) and the number of parking spaces grew from seven hundred to one thousand. Businesses located in the expansion part included K-Supermarket, Posti Group, Tokmanni, Jysk and the self storage rental company Cityvarasto.

In 2005, the total revenue of the Columbus shopping centre was over 65 million euro.

=== The Citycon era (2006-present) ===
In 2006, the shopping centre had about sixty tenants. Paulig sold the Columbus building, which was not part of its core business, to Citycon for 80 million euro. Paulig spent part of this money to building a new coffee roastery in Vuosaari.

A second expansion was completed in autumn 2007, with K-Citymarket as its main tenant. The leasable business area of the centre grew to 20,000 m^{2} (220,000 sq ft). In autumn 2016, the K-Citymarket store in the centre was downgraded back to K-Supermarket.

In July 2012, a glass window of about five m^{2} (54 sq ft) in area fell down from a height of ten m (33 ft) in the shopping centre. No one was injured.

In February 2019, Paulig and Citycon made a preliminary business deal with Bonava about the lots located in Vuosaari. The area is located in Vuosaari, in the northern part of Aurinkolahti, between the metro station, the shopping centre and other activities in Vuosaari. Bonava plans on buying building rights of about 32,000 m^{2} (340,000 sq ft) habitable space for owner-occupied and rental apartments.

== Businesses ==
Numerous businesses related to daily groceries, clothes, beauty, the household and free time, as well as restaurants and services, are located in the Columbus shopping centre. Businesses in the centre include Alko, R-kioski, S-Market, K-Supermarket, Lindex, Hesburger, Subway, a pharmacy and Tokmanni. The newest tenant in the centre is Lidl.

== Gallery ==
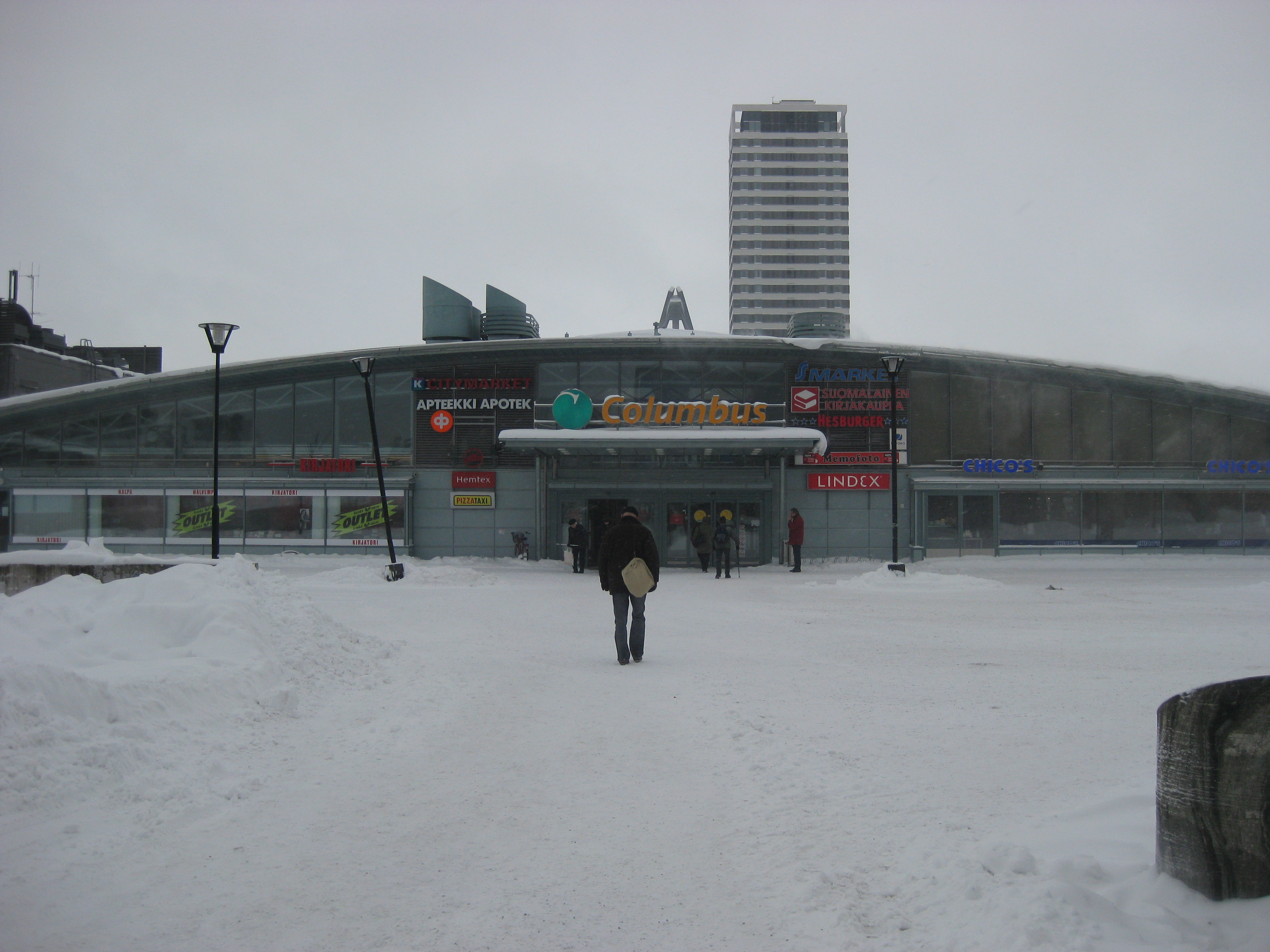
The northern entrance from Mosaiikkitori

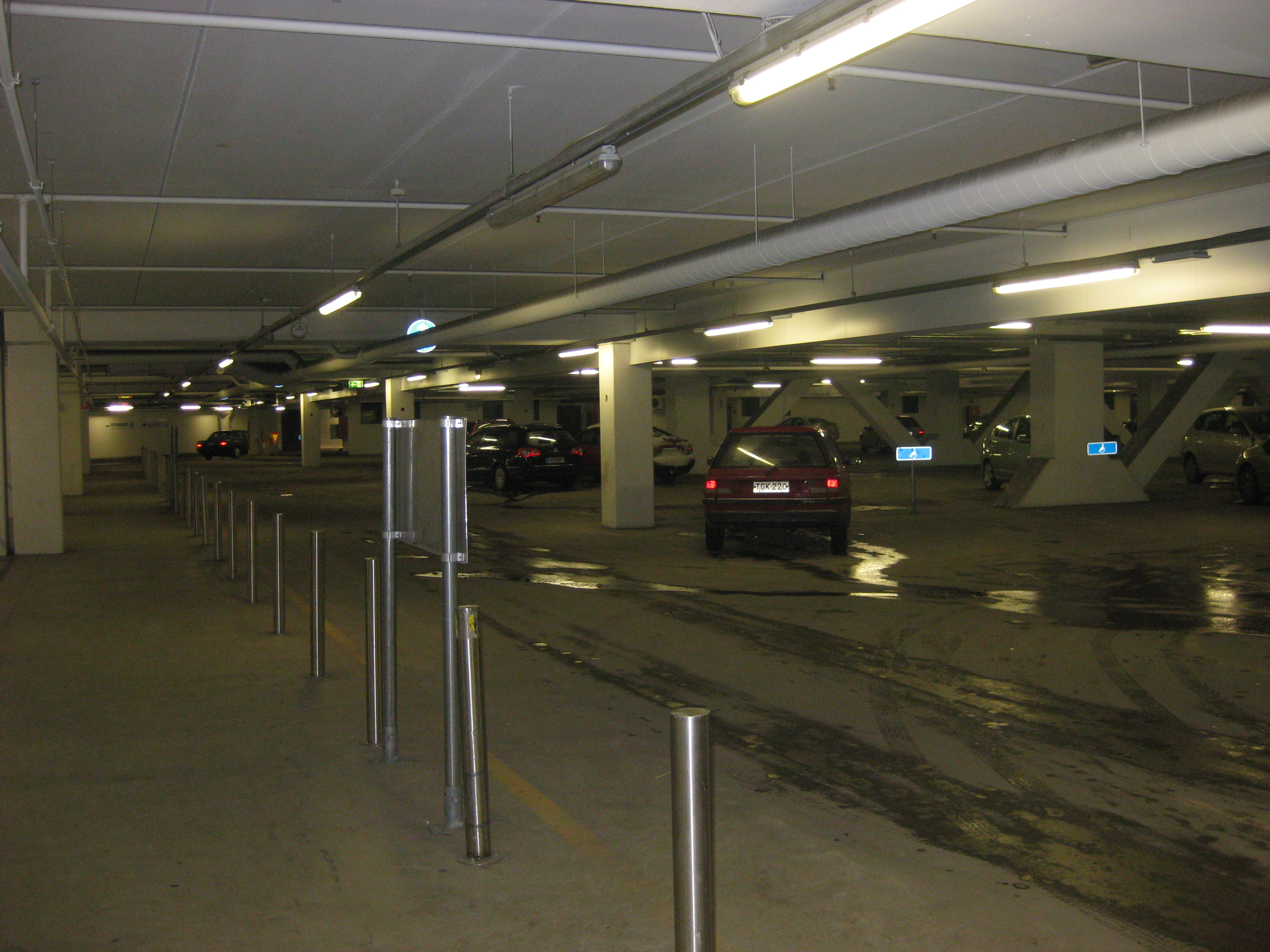
The parking garage

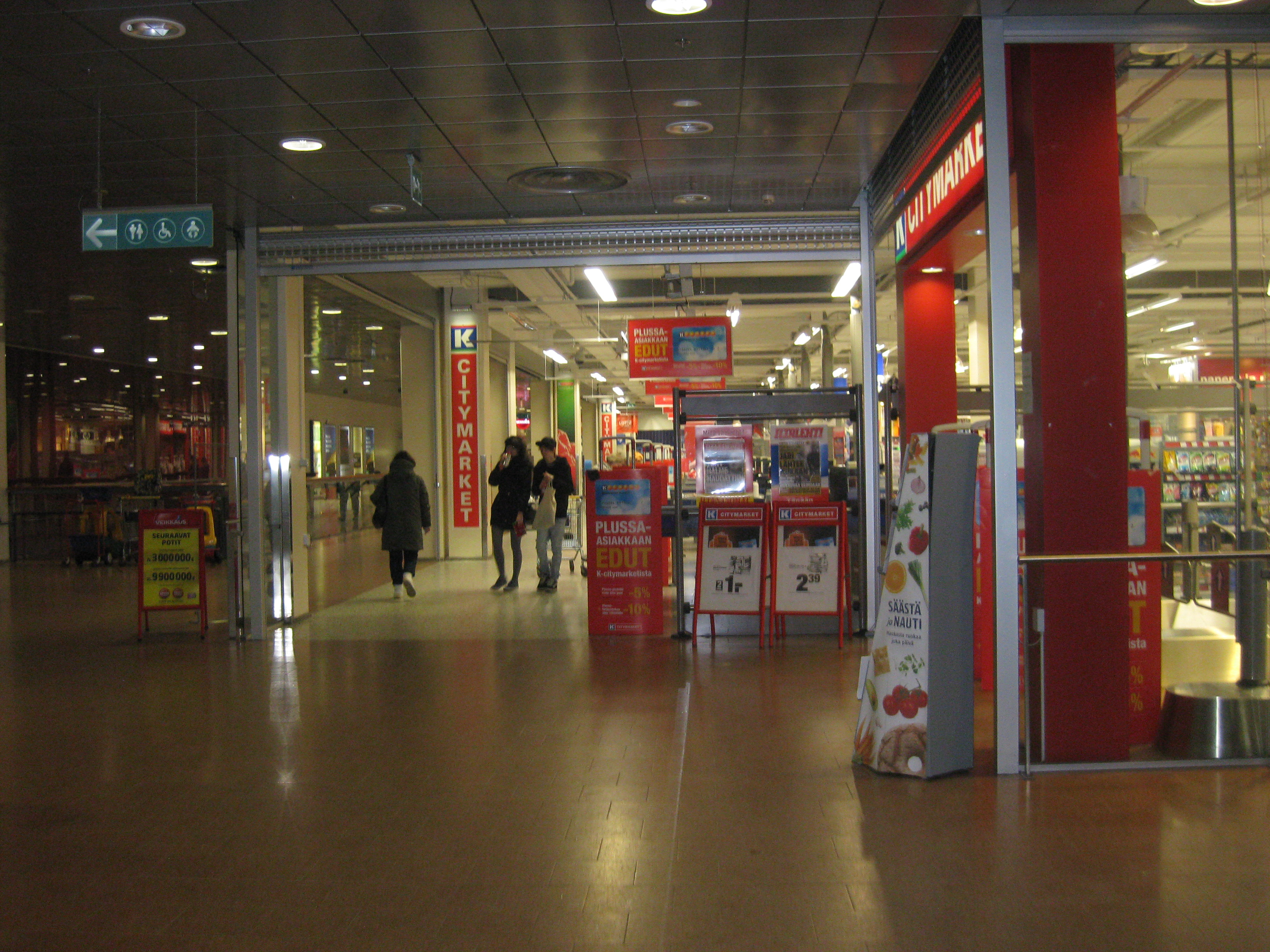
K-Supermarket (previously K-Citymarket)

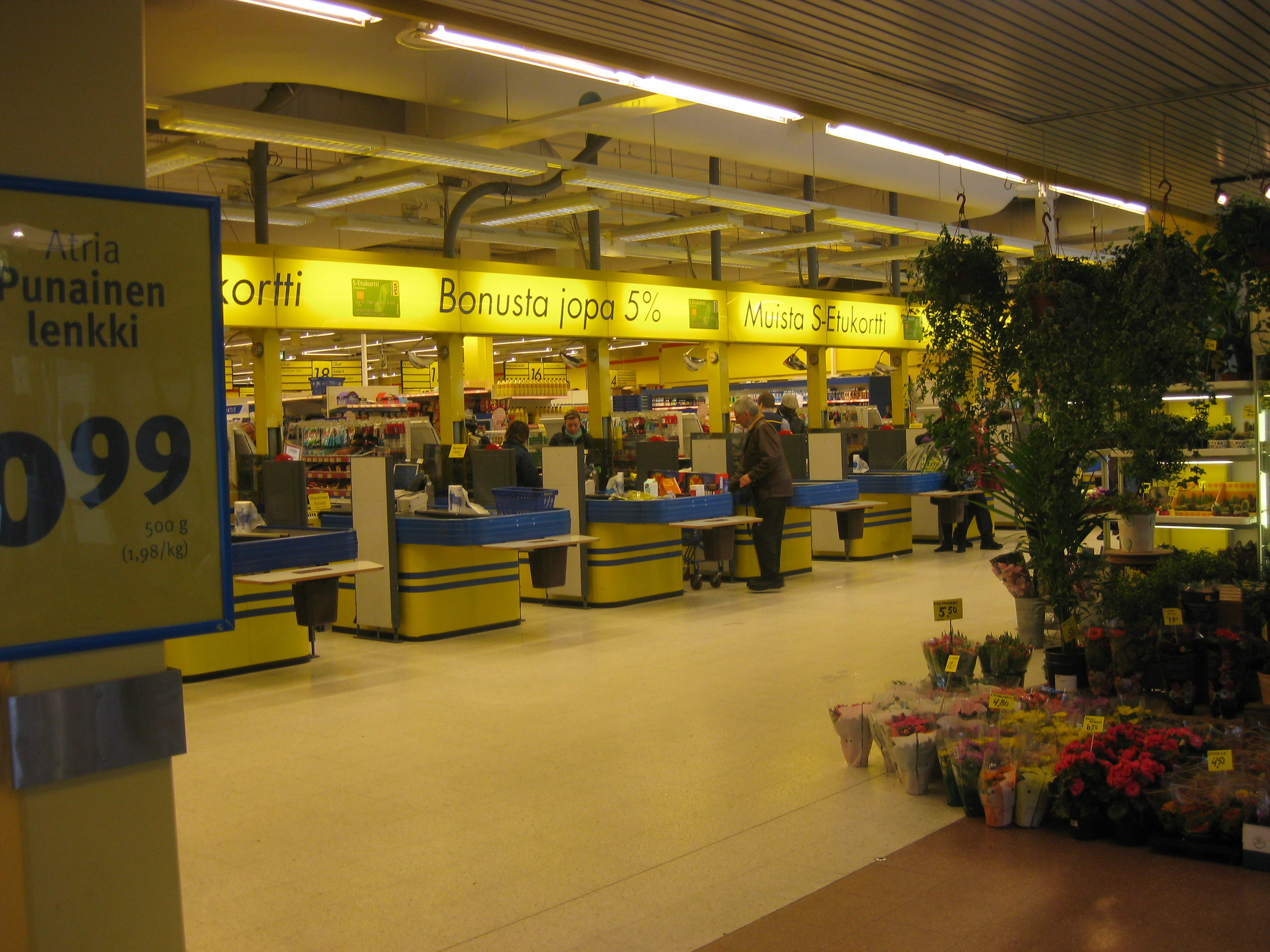
S-market

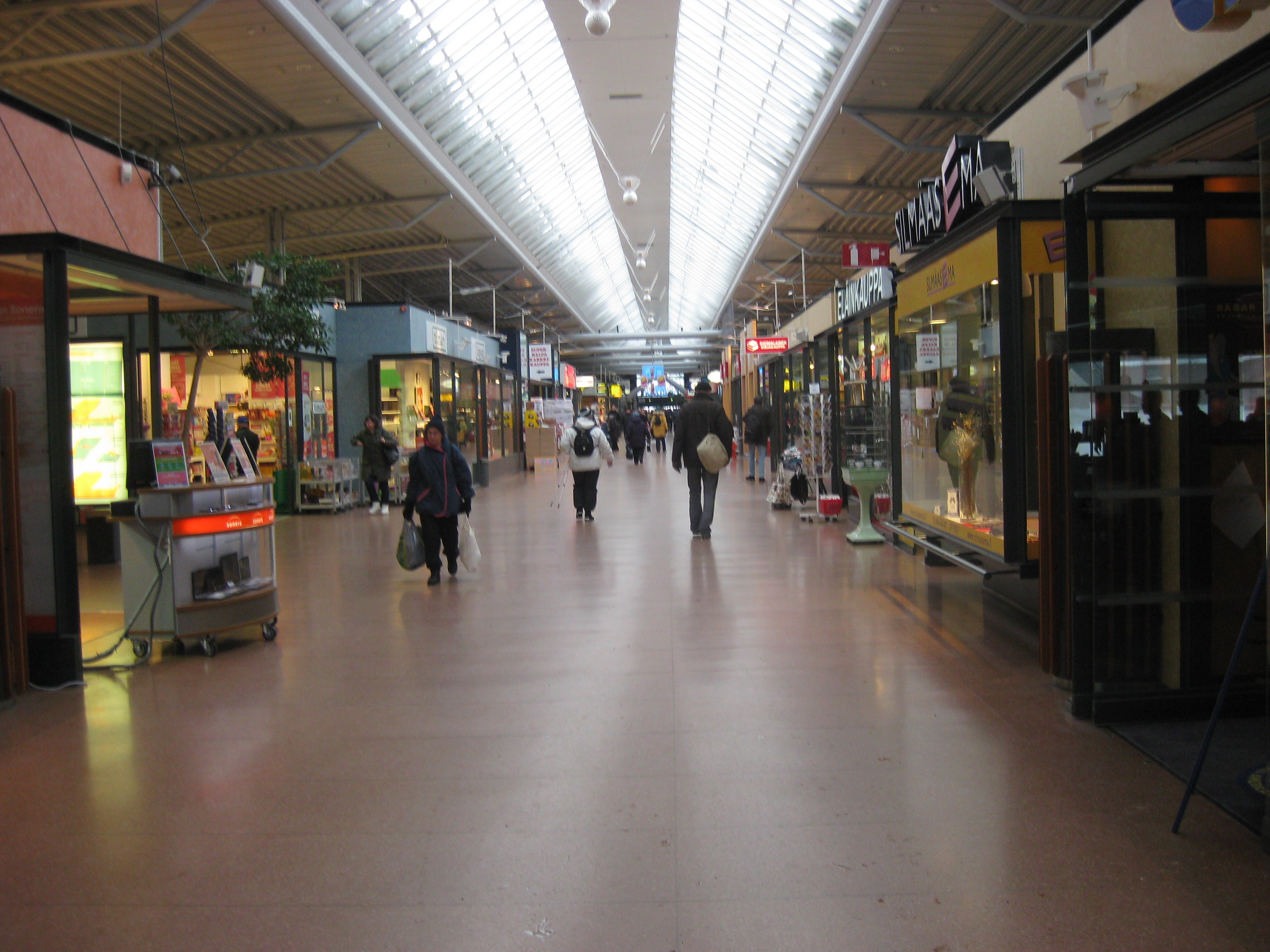
A view of Columbus seen from the northern part
