= Columbus metropolitan area =

Columbus metropolitan area may refer to:

- Columbus metropolitan area, Georgia, United States
- Columbus metropolitan area, Indiana, United States
- Columbus micropolitan area, Mississippi, United States
- Columbus micropolitan area, Nebraska, United States
- Columbus metropolitan area, Ohio, United States

== See also ==
- Columbus (disambiguation)
