= Columbus City =

Columbus City may refer to:

- Columbus City, Marshall County, Alabama
- Columbus City, Georgia
- Columbus City, Iowa
- City of Columbus, Ohio

== See also ==
- Columbus City Hall (disambiguation)
- Columbus (disambiguation)
