= Cristoforo Colombo (disambiguation) =

Cristoforo Colombo (1451–1506) was a European explorer better known as "Christopher Columbus".

Cristoforo Colombo may also refer to:

- Cristoforo Colombo (opera), an 1892 opera in four acts and an epilogue by Italian Alberto Franchetti
- SS Cristoforo Colombo, an Italian ocean liner built in the 1950s
- Italian corvette Cristoforo Colombo (1892), an Italian unprotected corvette
- Italian school ship Cristoforo Colombo (1926), an Italian tall ship, later Dunay in the Soviet Navy
- Via Cristoforo Colombo, a road in Rome named for Christopher Columbus
- Genoa Cristoforo Colombo Airport, airport of Genoa, Italy

== See also ==
- Christopher Columbus (disambiguation)
- Cristoforo (given name)
