= Columbus City Hall =

Columbus City Hall may refer to:

- Columbus City Hall (Indiana)
- Columbus City Hall (Ohio)
  - Columbus City Hall (1872–1921)
- Columbus City Hall (Wisconsin)

== See also ==
- Columbus (disambiguation)
- Columbus City (disambiguation)
