= Maria Colombo =

Maria Colombo or María Colombo may refer to:

- María Colombo (field hockey) (born 1962), Argentine Olympic athlete
- Maria Colombo (mathematician) (born 1989), Italian mathematician
- María Colombo de Acevedo, Argentine politician
- María Isabel Colombo, Argentine biochemist, 2010 winner of Bernardo Houssay Award
- Maria Luisa Colombo (born 1952), Italian singer-songwriter better known as Lu Colombo
