= List of places named for Christopher Columbus =

A number of places, mostly in the Western Hemisphere, have been named after the Genoese explorer Christopher Columbus, who was the first European to make the "New World" widely known to Europeans. Also, like "America" (a derivation from another explorer's name), the derivation "Columbia" became associated with the New World or the Americas in general.

== Countries ==
- Colombia
- Gran Colombia (historical)

== Subnational jurisdictions ==
- British Columbia, province of Canada
- Colón Province, province of Panama
- Columbia District (historical), disputed between the United Kingdom and the United States
- District of Columbia, federal district of the United States
- Colón Department, department of Honduras

== Cities, towns, and villages ==
- Colombo, Brazil, municipality in the state of Paraná
- Columbia, California, city
- Columbia, Connecticut, town
- Columbus, Georgia, city
- Columbia, Illinois, city
- Columbus, Indiana, city
- Columbus, Kansas, city
- Columbia, Maine, town
- Columbia, Maryland, census-designated place
- Columbia Heights, Minnesota, suburb of Minneapolis
- Columbus, Mississippi, city
- Columbia, Missouri, city
- Columbus, Montana, town
- Columbia, New Hampshire, town
- Columbus, New Mexico, village
- Columbus, New York, town
- Columbus, North Carolina, town
- Columbiana, Ohio, city
- Columbus, Ohio, capital of the U.S. state
- Colón, Panama, second-largest city in Panama
- Columbia, South Carolina, capital of the U.S state
- Columbia, Tennessee, city
- Columbus, Texas, city
- West Columbia, Texas, city
- Columbus, Wisconsin, city

== Counties ==
- Columbia County, Georgia
- Columbia County, New York
- Columbia County, Oregon
- Columbia County, Pennsylvania
- Columbia County, Wisconsin
- Columbiana County, Ohio
- Columbus County, North Carolina

== Streets and urban components ==
=== Europe ===
- France
- Rue Christophe Colomb, 66430, Bompas Municipality, Arrondissement of Perpignan
- Quai Christophe Colomb, 66700, Argelès-sur-Mer, Arrondissement of Céret
- Rue Christophe Colomb, 66390, Baixas, Arrondissement of Perpignan
- Rue Christophe Colomb, 91300, Massy Municipality, Arrondissement of Palaiseau
- Rue Christophe Colomb, 49800, Trélazé, Arrondissement of Angers
- Rue Christophe Colomb, 11000, Carcassonne, Arrondissement of Carcassonne
- Rue Christophe Colomb, 78180, Montigny-le-Bretonneux, Arrondissement of Versailles
- Rue Christophe Colomb, 54220, Malzéville, Arrondissement of Nancy
- Rue Christophe Colomb, 54220, Saint-Max, Arrondissement of Nancy
- Rue Christophe Colomb, 94310, Orly, Arrondissement de L'Haÿ-les-Roses
- Rue Christophe Colomb, 59400, Cambrai, Arrondissement of Cambrai
- Rue Christophe Colomb, 59553, Lauwin-Planque, Arrondissement of Douai
- Rue Christophe Colomb, 59480, La Bassée Municipality, Arrondissement of Lille
- Rue Christophe Colomb, 59110, La Madeleine Municipality, Arrondissement of Lille
- Rue Christophe Colomb, 59110, Marcq-en-Barœul, Arrondissement of Lille
- Rue Christophe Colomb, 44980, Sainte-Luce-sur-Loire, Arrondissement of Nantes
- Rue Christophe Colomb, 44340, Bouguenais, Arrondissement of Nantes
- Rue Christophe Colomb, 34500, Béziers, Arrondissement of Béziers
- Avenue Christophe Colomb, 13960, Sausset-les-Pins, Arrondissement of Istres
- Rue Christophe Colomb, 44470, Thouaré-sur-Loire, Arrondissement of Nantes
- Impasse Christophe Colomb, 24660, Coulounieix-Chamiers, Arrondissement of Périgueux
- Rue Christophe Colomb, 24000, Périgueux, Arrondissement of Périgueux
- Avenue Christophe Colomb, 38090, Villefontaine, Arrondissement of La Tour-du-Pin
- Passage Christophe Colomb, 37700, Saint-Pierre-des-Corps, Arrondissement de Tours
- Rue Christophe Colomb, 11560, Fleury Municipality, Arrondissement of Narbonne
- Avenue Christophe Colomb, 16800, Soyaux, Arrondissement of Angoulême
- Allée Christophe Colomb, 33370, Artigues-près-Bordeaux, Arrondissement of Bordeaux
- Rond-Point Christophe Colomb, 06210, Mandelieu-la-Napoule, Arrondissement of Grasse
- Allée Christophe Colomb, 44210, Pornic, Arrondissement of Saint-Nazaire
- Allée Christophe Colomb, 44730, Saint-Michel-Chef-Chef, Arrondissement of Saint-Nazaire
- Allée Christophe Colomb, 62510, Arques Municipality, Arrondissement of Saint-Omer
- Rue Christophe Colomb, 13118, Istres, Arrondissement of Istres
- Avenue Christophe Colomb, 76600, Le Havre, Arrondissement of Le Havre
- Rue Christophe Colomb, 33140, Villenave-d'Ornon, Arrondissement of Bordeaux
- Allée Christophe Colomb, 33260, La Teste-de-Buch, Arrondissement of Arcachon
- Allée Christophe Colomb, 03100, Montluçon, Arrondissement of Montluçon
- Avenue Christophe Colomb, 73800, Francin, Porte-de-Savoie
- Rue Christophe Colomb, 87100, Limoges, Arrondissement of Limoges
- Rue Christophe Colomb, 80090, Amiens, Arrondissement of Amiens
- Impasse Christophe Colomb, 87400, Saint-Martin-Terressus, Arrondissement of Limoges
- Rue Christophe Colomb, 17440, Aytré, Arrondissement of La Rochelle
- Rue Christophe Colomb, 07500, Guilherand-Granges, Arrondissement of Tournon-sur-Rhône
- Rue Christophe Colomb, 14520, Port-en-Bessin-Huppain, Arrondissement of Bayeux
- Rue Christophe Colomb, 82000, Montauban, Arrondissement of Montauban
- Rue Christophe Colomb, 59820, Gravelines, Arrondissement of Dunkirk
- Rue Christophe Colomb, 79260, La Crèche, Arrondissement of Niort
- Rue Christophe Colomb, 79250, Nueil-les-Aubiers, Arrondissement of Bressuire
- Impasse Christophe Colomb, 76460, Saint-Valery-en-Caux, Arrondissement of Dieppe
- Impasse Christophe Colomb, 69780, Mions, Arrondissement of Lyon
- Rue Christophe Colomb, 85300, Challans, Arrondissement of Les Sables-d'Olonne
- Impasse Christophe Colomb, 85000, La Roche-sur-Yon, Arrondissement of La Roche-sur-Yon
- Rue Christophe Colomb, 85130, Les Landes-Genusson, Arrondissement of La Roche-sur-Yon
- Rue Christophe Colomb, 18110, Fussy, Arrondissement of Bourges
- Rue Christophe Colomb, 34350, Vendres, Arrondissement of Béziers
- Rue Christophe Colomb, 34130, Mauguio, Arrondissement of Montpellier
- Square Christophe Colomb, 91170, Quartier du Plateau, Viry-Châtillon
- Allée Christophe Colomb, 77340, Pontault-Combault, Arrondissement of Torcy
- Rue Christophe Colomb, 33560, Sainte-Eulalie Municipality, Arrondissement of Bordeaux
- Rue Christophe Colomb, 27000, Évreux, Arrondissement of Évreux
- Impasse Christophe Colomb, 42190, Saint-Nizier-sous-Charlieu, Arrondissement of Roanne
- Rue Christophe Colomb, 71800, Baudemont, Arrondissement of Charolles
- Rue Christophe Colomb, 83610, Collobrières, Arrondissement of Toulon
- Avenue Christophe Colomb, 20260, Calvi, Arrondissement of Calvi
- Rue Christophe Colomb, 62800, Liévin, Arrondissement of Lens
- Rue Christophe Colomb, 62300, Lens, Arrondissement of Lens
- Rue Christophe Colomb, 62640, Montigny-en-Gohelle, Arrondissement of Lens
- Rue Christophe Colomb, 31000, Les Chalets - Saint-Aubin - Saint-Étienne, Place Occitane, Toulouse Centre, Toulouse
- Place Christophe Colomb, 34000, Port Marianne, Port Marianne, Montpellier
- Rue Christophe Colomb, 75008, Quartier des Champs-Élysées, 8th Arrondissement of Paris
- Rue Christophe Colomb, 11210, Port-la-Nouvelle, Arrondissement of Narbonne
- Rue Christophe Colomb, 71000, Flacé-lès-Mâcon, Mâcon Municipality
- Impasse Christophe Colomb, 91000, Bras de Fer, Évry, Évry-Courcouronnes
- Place Christophe Colomb, 91000, Bras de Fer, Évry, Évry-Courcouronnes
- Rue Christophe-Colomb, 94200, Louis Bertrand - Mirabeau - Sémard, Ivry-sur-Seine
- Rue Christophe Colomb, 13008, Vauban, 6th Arrondissement, Marseille
- Rue Christophe Colomb, 62700, La Buissière, Bruay-la-Buissière
- Allée Christophe Colomb, 33600, Magonty, Pessac
- Rue Christophe Colomb, 33700, Chemin Long, Mérignac Municipality
- Rue Christophe Colomb, 49300, Cholet, Cholet
- Rue Christophe Colomb, 78500, La Plaine, Sartrouville
- Rue Christophe Colomb, 93600, Rose des Vents, Aulnay-sous-Bois
- Rue Christophe Colomb, 94370, Le Bas de Sucy, Sucy-en-Brie
- Rue Christophe Colomb, 44800, Preux, Saint-Herblain
- Rue Christophe Colomb, 44800, Atlantis, Saint-Herblain
- Rue Christophe Colomb, 44600, Québrais, Saint-Nazaire Municipality
- Rue Christophe Colomb, 49100, Doutre-Saint-Jacques-Nazareth, Angers
- Allée Christophe Colomb, 93130, Centre-Ville - Mairie, Noisy-le-Sec
- Allée Christophe Colomb, 93270, Les Beaudottes, Sevran
- Impasse Christophe Colomb, 66140, Alizés, Canet-en-Roussillon
- Rue Christophe Colomb, 49460, La Mastelle, Montreuil-Juigné
- Rue Christophe Colomb, 83260, La Moutonne, La Crau
- Rue Christophe Colomb, 78180, Les Arcades du Lac, Montigny-le-Bretonneux
- Allée Christophe Colomb, 91420, Le Poirier Marlé, Morangis Municipality
- Rue Christophe Colomb, 94600, Quartier des Navigateurs, Choisy-le-Roi
- Rue Christophe Colomb, 84200, Quartier du Pous Du Plan, Carpentras
- Rue Christophe Colomb, 33160, Les Garrouilles, Saint-Aubin-de-Médoc
- Rue Christophe Colomb, 34200, Les Granges, Sète
- Rue Christophe Colomb, 79000, Les Brizeaux, Quartier Nord, Niort
- Rue Christophe Colomb, 26000, Châteauvert, Valence Municipality
- Rue Christophe Colomb, 86280, Les Vieilles Vignes, Saint-Benoît Municipality
- Place Christophe Colomb, 69300, Saint Clair, Caluire-et-Cuire
- Avenue Christophe Colomb, 51100, Châtillons, Reims
- Rue Christophe Colomb, 22130, Canlac, Plancoët
- Allée Christophe Colomb, 26700, Les Blaches, Pierrelatte
- Rue Christophe Colomb, 37000, Sanitas, Tours
- Rue Christophe Colomb, 40130, Durdilly, Capbreton
- Rue Christophe Colomb, 29200, Porte de la Grande Rivière, Brest
- Rue Christophe Colomb, 59290, Le Capreau, Wasquehal
- Rue Christophe Colomb, 56890, Les Hauts de Catric, Saint-Avé
- Rue Christophe Colomb, 85180, La Métairie, Château-d'Olonne, Les Sables-d'Olonne
- Rue Christophe Colomb, 57100, Les Basses Terres, Thionville
- Rue Christophe Colomb, 75008, Champs-Elysées, Quartier du Faubourg-du-Roule, 8th Arrondissement of Paris
- Rue Christophe Colomb, 85170, Le Petit Logis, Belleville-sur-Vie, Bellevigny
- Boulevard Christophe Colomb, 59820, Les Huttes, Gravelines
- Impasse Christophe Colomb, 66470, La Mar, Sainte-Marie-la-Mer
- Rue Christophe Colomb, 18000, Les Petits Danjons, Bourges
- Rue Christophe Colomb, 07430, Médecin, Davézieux
- Rue Christophe Colomb, 07430, Plantas, Davézieux
- Rue Christophe Colomb, 34470, Mas Rouge, Pérols
- Allée Christophe Colomb, 35160, Bel Air, Montfort-sur-Meu
- Allée Christophe Colomb, 89000, Rive Droite, Auxerre
- Rue Christophe Colomb, 35760, Le Champ Daguet, Champ Daguet, Saint-Grégoire Municipality
- Rue Christophe Colomb, 17137, Fief Arnaud, Nieul-sur-Mer
- Impasse Christophe Colomb, 53200, Les Petits Champs, Saint-Fort, Château-Gontier-sur-Mayenne
- Rue Christophe Colomb, 24640, Pompougnac, La Boissière-d'Ans, Cubjac-Auvézère-Val d'Ans
- Rue Christophe Colomb, 79260, Baussais 1, La Crèche
- Rue Christophe Colomb, 79260, Baussais 2, La Crèche
- Allée Christophe Colomb, 33260, La Fagotière, La Teste-de-Buch
- Impasse Christophe Colomb, 62730, Les Hemmes de Marck, Marck
- Rue Christophe Colomb, 35400, Le Tertre de Beaulieu, Paramé, Saint-Malo
- Rue Christophe Colomb, 37170, Belle Vue, Chambray-lès-Tours
- Allée Christophe Colomb, 93160, Maille-Horizon, Noisy-le-Grand
- Impasse Christophe Colomb, 35460, La Houasserie, Saint-Brice-en-Coglès, Maen-Roch
- Allée Christophe Colomb, 91320, Résidence Le Bois-Charlet, Wissous
- Rue Christophe Colomb, 10120, Les Vignots, Saint-André-les-Vergers
- Rue Christophe Colomb, 59800, Faubourg de Roubaix, Lille, Lille
- Rue Christophe Colomb, 41000, Les Hautes Bretaches, Croix-chevalier, Nord, Blois
- Rue Christophe Colomb, 37140, La Salpêtrerie, Bourgueil
- Rue Christophe Colomb, 78200, Le Val Fouré, Mantes-la-Jolie
- Rue Christophe Colomb, Tours, Arrondissement de Tours
- Rue Christophe Colomb, Carpentras, Arrondissement of Carpentras
- Rue Christophe Colomb, Mantes-la-Jolie, Arrondissement of Mantes-la-Jolie
- Rue Christophe Colomb, Arrondissement of Nancy, Meurthe-et-Moselle
- Rue Christophe Colomb, Choisy-le-Roi, Arrondissement de L'Haÿ-les-Roses
- Rue Christophe Colomb, Davézieux, Arrondissement of Tournon-sur-Rhône
- Rue Christophe Colomb, Arrondissement of Lille, Nord
- Rue Christophe Colomb, Saint-Herblain, Arrondissement of Nantes
- Italy
  - Streets in numerous cities, such as Cristoforo Colombo Avenue in Rome, connecting Ostia with the EUR district.
- Portugal
  - At least 20 streets, 1 avenue and 1 square; also a shopping mall

=== North America ===
- Canada
  - Québec
    - Avenue Christophe-Colomb, Montréal, Québec, Canada
    - Avenue Colomb, Brossard, Québec, Canada
    - Rue Christophe-Colomb, Ville de Québec, Québec, Canada
    - Rue Christophe-Colomb, Boucherville, Québec, Canada
    - Rue Christophe-Colomb, Chibougamau, Québec, Canada
    - Rue Christophe-Colomb, Cowanswille, Québec, Canada
    - Rue Christophe-Colomb, Gatineau, Québec, Canada
    - Rue Christophe-Colomb, Granby, Québec, Canada
    - Rue Christophe-Colomb, La Tuque, Québec, Canada
    - Rue Christophe-Colomb, Lévis, Québec, Canada
    - Rue Christophe-Colomb, Repentigny, Québec, Canada
    - Rue Christophe-Colomb, Sept-Îles, Québec, Canada
    - Rue Christophe-Colomb, Thetford Mines, Québec, Canada
    - Rue Colomb, Rawdon, Québec, Canada
    - Rue Colomb, Sainte-Catherine, Québec, Canada
    - Chemin Christophe-Colomb, Val-des-Monts, Québec, Canada
    - Parc Christophe-Colomb, Saint-Jean-sur-Richelieu, Québec, Canada
- United States
  - Columbus Circle, New York, New York, U.S.
  - Columbus Avenue, San Francisco, California, U.S.
  - Columbus Avenue, Columbus, Ohio, U.S.
  - Columbus Avenue, New York, New York, U.S.
  - Columbus Avenue, Boston, Massachusetts, U.S.
  - Columbus Street, Columbus, Ohio, U.S.
  - Interstate 10 in California, U.S. was designated and signed as the Christopher Columbus Transcontinental Highway from 1976 to 2022

=== Asia ===
- Philippines
  - Colon Street, Cebu, Philippines

== Other ==
=== North America ===
- Canada
  - Québec
    - Lac Colomb, Eeyou Istchee Baie-James, Québec, Canada
    - Rivière Colomb, Eeyou Istchee Baie-James, Québec, Canada
    - Pointe Colomb, L'Île-d'Anticosti, Québec, Canada
