= Christopher Columbus (1949 film) =

- Theatrical release poster
- Directed by: David MacDonald
- Written by: Muriel Box; Sydney Box; Cyril Roberts
- Based on: Columbus; 1941 novel by Rafael Sabatini
- Produced by: Sydney Box; A. Frank Bundy
- Starring: Fredric March; Florence Eldridge; Francis L. Sullivan; Kathleen Ryan
- Narrated by: Valentine Dyall
- Cinematography: Stephen Dade
- Edited by: Vladimir Sagovsky
- Music by: Arthur Bliss
- Production company: Gainsborough Pictures
- Distributed by: General Film Distributors
- Release date: 12 October 1949
- Running time: 104 minutes
- Country: United Kingdom
- Language: English
- Budget: £500,000
- Box office: £121,000 (by 1953)

Christopher Columbus is a 1949 British biographical film starring Fredric March as Christopher Columbus and Florence Eldridge as Queen Isabella. It is loosely based on the 1941 novel Columbus by Rafael Sabatini, with much of the screenplay rewritten by Sydney and Muriel Box.

== Plot ==
Christopher Columbus, an explorer from Genoa, Italy, arrives in Spain with his son seeking funds for a trip to India. He obtains an introduction at court from Father Perez, the former confessor for Queen Isabella.

Columbus is opposed by Francisco de Bobadilla, who uses Beatriz to distract Columbus; however, eventually the Queen agrees to finance Columbus's ships, the Niña, the Pinta, and the Santa Maria, on their journey.

On the trip over, the crew threaten mutiny. Columbus promises to turn back if no land is found in three days. On the third night, Columbus sees a light, and they reach the New World.

Columbus returns to Spain a hero but continues to face opposition at court, even as his discoveries help turn Spain into a rich country.

== Cast ==
- Fredric March as Christopher Columbus
- Florence Eldridge as Queen Isabella
- Francis L. Sullivan as Francisco de Bobadilla
- Kathleen Ryan as Beatriz
- Derek Bond as Diego de Arana
- Nora Swinburne as Joanna de Torres
- Abraham Sofaer as Luis de Santángel
- Linden Travers as Beatriz de Peraza
- James Robertson Justice as Martín Pinzón
- Dennis Vance as Francisco Pinzón
- Richard Aherne as Vicente Pinzón
- Felix Aylmer as Father Pérez
- Francis Lister as King Ferdinand
- Edward Rigby as Pedro
- Niall MacGinnis as Juan de la Costa
- Ralph Truman as Captain
- Ronald Adam as Talavera
- Guy Le Feuvre as Admiral
- Lyn Evans as Lope
- David Cole as Columbus' Son
- Hugh Pryse as Almoner
- Stuart Lindsell as Prior

== Development ==
The film was a passion project for producer Sydney Box, who in 1945 had a huge success with The Seventh Veil. In September 1946, Box announced he would make the film from Sabatini's novel for the United Kingdom Moving Picture Company. Finance would come from the Rank Organisation. The film was part of a deliberate attempt by Rank to break into the American market, following the path blazed with films like Henry V (1944) and Caesar and Cleopatra (1945). John Woolf, head of international distribution for Rank, said in October 1946 that:

Before we smacked Henry V and Caesar and Cleopatra into the American Markets, we were getting a poor showing in the United States. Although the most optimistic figures have been put out in London about the achievements of Henry and Caesar, in fact they have had to fight hard to make their way. The important thing to remember is this— that these big films enabled us to break through the highly controlled theatre circuits in America. We are using them as a spearhead to get a showing of British films.

For a time it seemed there would be a rival movie on the same subject produced by Edward Small from a biography by David Lawrence. The other film was not made.

When Box became head of Gainsborough Pictures, he immediately put the project in development at that studio. In January 1947, Sabatini was reportedly working on the script.

=== Casting ===
In October 1946, Box said he wanted a young, virile actor to play the lead. Stewart Granger was originally mentioned. In January 1947, Arturo de Córdova was announced as star.

In August 1947, Sydney Box arrived in Hollywood to sign a star. He met with James Mason. Then in September he announced he had signed Fredric March and Florence Eldridge to play the leads.

"It's a great part", said March.

== Shooting ==
March arrived in England in April 1948 for what was meant to be a five-month shoot. Studio filming took place at Pinewood, and there was location filming in Barbados. March had recently had an operation and suffered a relapse while in London.

Two ships, replicas of the Niña and Santa María, were built especially for the film, and in April 1948 they were shipped from Spain to London.

Shooting was often difficult. The replica of the Santa Maria broke its moorings during a squall in the West Indies and drifted for two nights and a day with people on board before it was rescued. Then a fire broke out, and the ship was burnt. It had to be rebuilt at a cost of £100,000 (equivalent to £4.12 million or US$5.26 million in 2024) because scenes set on it had yet to be shot. March collapsed one day due to heatstroke.

=== Reshoots ===
A new subplot was added towards the end of shooting involving the romance between Columbus and the sister (Kathleen Ryan) of his lieutenant (Derek Bond).

March was reportedly very disappointed with the final film.

The Francoist Spanish government considered the portrait of Columbus to be unflattering. In response the leading Spanish studio CIFESA produced Dawn of America (1951), which portrayed Columbus as a more daring figure.

Muriel Box later called the film "a calamity but we couldn’t avoid it happening." She added:

We were pressed into making it, didn’t want to do it at all. The script had been paid for by Gainsborough Pictures, and when we got there in 1945 they asked us to make it. I got in one or two other authors to help us work on it, but it was doomed from the start. The whole unit went out to the Caribbean with the Santa Maria and they were sailing the ship around, and they lost it! Later it caught fire!.. There was trouble with the artistes, everything. The first rehearsal we called was for a preliminary run-through of the script, to give the artistes an idea of the film as a whole. We called the whole cast to the Dorchester but Fredric March... didn’t turn up... We waited an hour or more, then I sent off the first assistant to find them. Freddie was very apologetic but said he couldn’t possibly come until their contract was signed. Of course people in England knew that, if Arthur Rank was financing the film, he would never break his word, that was enough. But it wasn’t the same for Freddie; he had too much experience of broken words in Hollywood.

== Reception ==
=== Critical ===
The New York Times called it "largely an uninspired succession of legendary but lifeless episodes."

=== Box-office ===
In April 1949 J. Arthur Rank told Hedda Hopper he thought the film would be his most successful of 1949. However, the film failed to recoup its enormous cost at the box office. By 1953, it only grossed £121,000 (equivalent to £4.08 million or US$5.21 million in 2024) in theatrical rentals around the world, leading to a loss of more than US$2 million.

== Bibliography ==
- Spicer, Andrew. British Film Makers: Sydney Box. Manchester University Press, 2006.
