= Andrés Colombo =

Argentine footballer

Personal information
- Full name: Andrés Gerardo Colombo
- Date of birth: 30 July 1987 (age 39)
- Place of birth: Rosario, Argentina
- Height: 1.78 m (5 ft 10 in)
- Position: Midfielder

Senior career*
Years	Team	Apps	(Gls)
2009	Osimana		
2010-2012	Deportes Concepción	29	(0)
2012	Deportes Quindío	8	(0)
2013-2014	Sportivo Rivadavia	6	
- * Club domestic league appearances and goals

Andrés Gerardo Colombo (born 30 July 1987 in Rosario, Argentina) is an Argentine former professional footballer who played as a midfielder.

== Clubs ==
- Osimana 2009
- Deportes Concepción 2010–2012
- Deportes Quindío 2012
