= Columbus (Rome) =

Columbus, La Balduina
- District of Rome
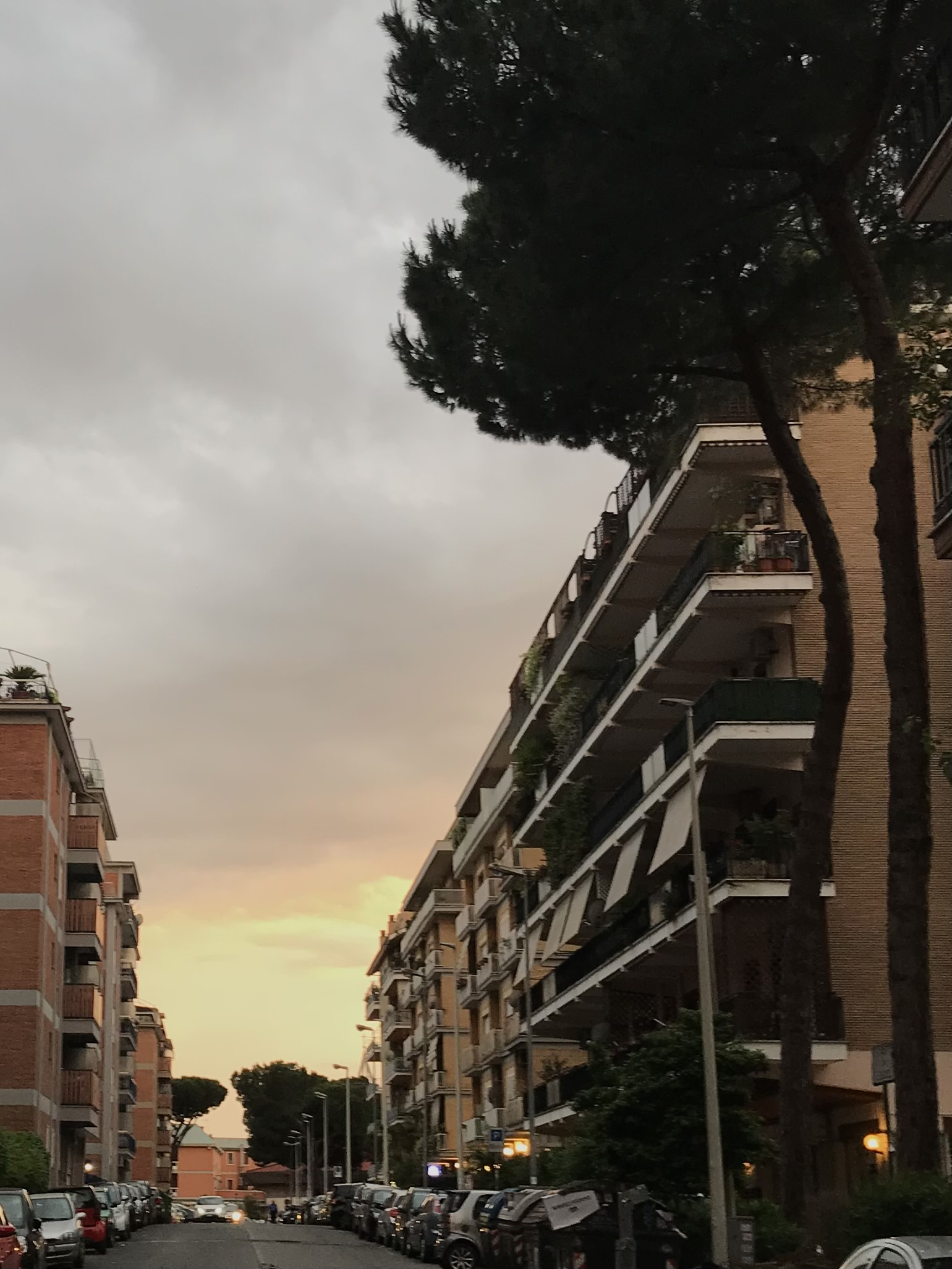
- Via Bernardo Barbiellini Amidei
- Interactive map of Columbus, La Balduina
- Coordinates: 41°55′30″N 12°25′37″E
- Country: Italy
- Region: Lazio
- City: Rome

Area
  - Total: 151 km^{2} (58 sq mi)

Population
  - Total: 1 452

Columbus is a residential district in Rome, Italy, in Balduina, located north of the city centre.

== History ==
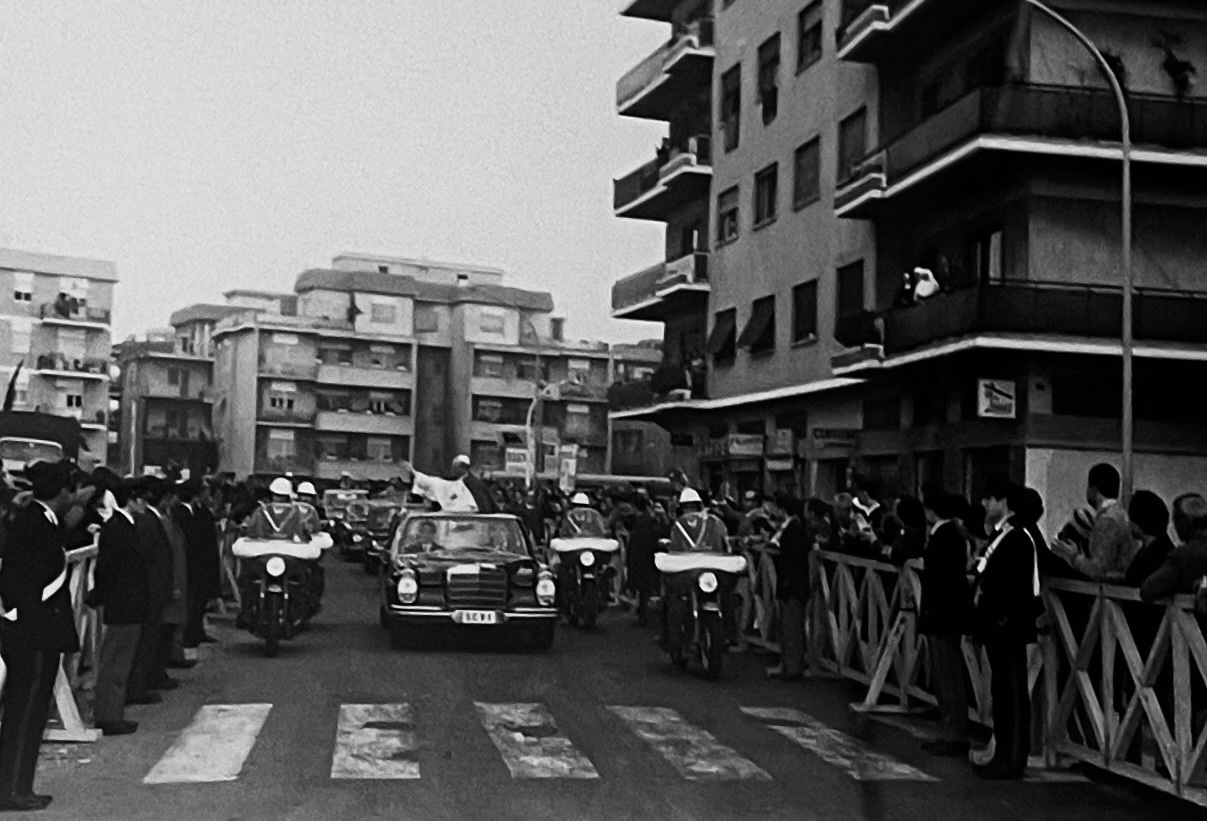
Pope Paul VI greets the faithful of the Columbus - Balduina neighborhood in Rome

In the past, the Columbus area was part of one of the largest estates outside Porta Angelica: the Pigneto estate, owned by the Sacchetti family, originally from Florence, who settled in Rome around the mid-1500s. The estate had a rural and a manorial part, the latter featuring a noble casino (built between 1625 and 1630) by Pietro da Cortona, now destroyed. It was a complex adorned with loggias, statues, nymphs, and water fountains, creating a strong scenic impact.

The reasons for the early and rapid abandonment of the building and estate (between the 17th and 18th centuries) leading to the destruction of the casino are uncertain. In 1861, the Sacchetti family sold the entire estate to Prince Alessandro Torlonia.

The neighborhood emerged during the economic boom years as a residential center surrounded by greenery, initially called "Villa del Pineto" or "Parco di Balduina." It was built by the "Società Edilizia Pineto," owned by the Torlonia family and the Società generale immobiliare.

The current name comes from the Columbus Integrated Complex, a hospital structure that was once private, established in the 1960s and initially named "Clinica «G. Moscati»" (the road leading to it is still named after Giuseppe Moscati). Later, it became "Clinica Columbus," and since the 2000s, the complex has been managed by the Agostino Gemelli University Polyclinic. Presently, the neighborhood is overseen by a private consortium and is part of the urban area 19F Pineto, with 1452 residents out of a total of 1921.

== Parks and gardens ==
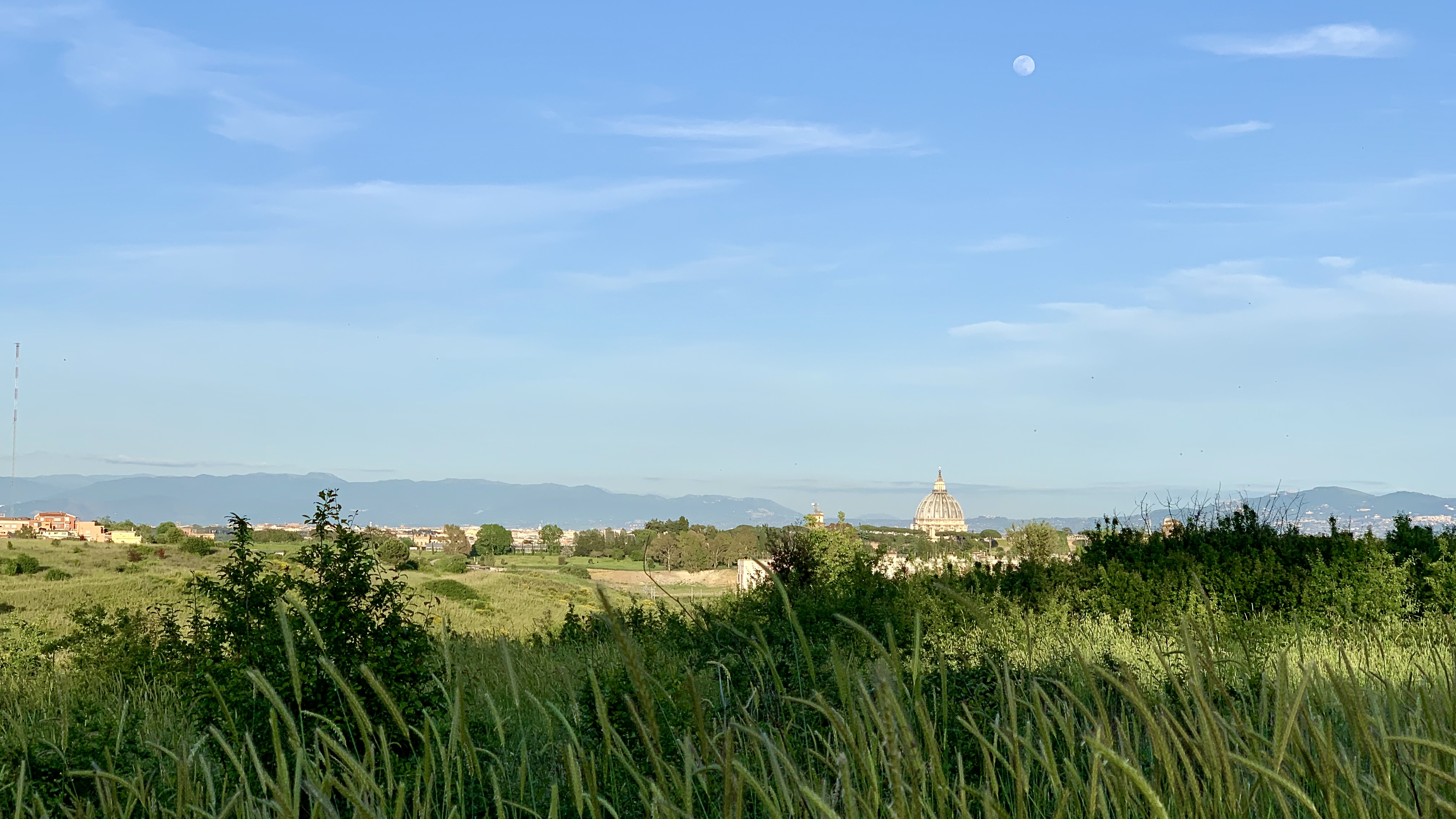
Pineto Regional Park, Balduina Columbus

- Pineto Regional Park is a protected natural area, instituted in 1987. It has the total area of approximately 240 hectares.

== Buildings ==
- The Gesù Divino Maestro Church is one of the most important modern churches of Rome. In 2006 it won the "Merit Award" for Liturgical Design del Faith and Form Award.
