= USS Columbus =

List of ships with the same or similar names

Four ships of the United States Navy have been named USS Columbus, the first two after the explorer Christopher Columbus, and the other two after Columbus, Ohio, the capital of the state.

- USS Columbus (1774), a 24-gun armed ship purchased for the Continental Navy in 1775, and active until it was captured and burned in 1778
- USS Columbus (1819), a 74-gun ship of the line commissioned in 1819, and in periodic service until 1861 when it was sunk to prevent capture
- USS Columbus (CA-74), a heavy cruiser commissioned at the very end of World War II, converted to a guided missile cruiser CG-12 in 1959, and decommissioned in 1975
- USS Columbus (SSN-762), a Los Angeles-class attack submarine commissioned in 1993 and in active service
