= Horacio Colombo =

Argentine basketball player

Personal information
- Born: 23 November 1934 (age 91)
Medals
Men's basketball
Representing Argentina
Pan American Games
Silver medal – second place	1955 Mexico City	Team

Horacio Colombo Carles (Note: In this Spanish name, the first or paternal surname is Colombo and the second or maternal family name is Carles.) (born 23 November 1934) is an Argentine former basketball player.
