= Camila Colombo =

Uruguayan psychopedagogue and chess player (born 1990)

- Born: Camila Colombo Seré; 4 June 1990 (age 36); Montevideo, Uruguay
- Education: Universidad Autónoma de Barcelona
- Occupations: Psychopedagogue, chess player
- Employer: Club Mágico de Extremadura
- Chess career
- Country: Uruguay
- Title: Woman International Master (2012)
- FIDE rating: 2084 (March 2022)
- Peak rating: 2129 (September 2009)

Camila Colombo Seré (born 4 June 1990) is a Uruguayan psychopedagogue and chess player. She was awarded the title of Woman International Master (WIM) by FIDE in 2012. Colombo is a multiple-time national women's champion.

== Personal life ==
Born in Montevideo, Camila Colombo, at age 8, together with her sisters, learned to play chess with their father.

Colombo studied education at the School of Humanities and Sciences at the University of the Republic, and psychopedagogy at Instituto Universitario CEDIIAP.

Since 2011, she has lived in Spain and works at the Club Mágico de Extremadura as a sports and therapeutic chess instructor. She is studying for a master's degree in neuropsychological rehabilitation and cognitive stimulation at the Autonomous University of Barcelona.

== Chess ==
She went on to play at the Uruguayan School of Chess for Club Banco República and participated in several national and international tournaments. In 2002 Colombo became the Uruguayan girls U12 champion and the South American school girls U12 champion. In the same year, she took the bronze medal for the third place of Uruguay in the South American team championships, and she also won the gold medal for the best player on board four. In 2007, Colombo became the South American girls U18 champion. Colombo won the Uruguayan women's championship for four consecutive years from 2007 to 2010. In 2011, she qualified to play in the Uruguayan absolute championship, becoming the first woman to do so. Later in the same year, Colombo finished third in the Zonal 2.5 women's tournament in Santiago de Chile. Thanks to this result, she was awarded the title of Woman International Master (WIM), becoming the first from Uruguay. In 2013, Colombo became again the Uruguayan women's champion.

She was part of the Uruguayan team at the Women's Chess Olympiad in 2008 in Dresden, 2012 in Istanbul and 2014 in Tromsø. Thanks to her performance in Dresden, Colombo was awarded the title of Woman FIDE Master (WFM) in 2009.

== Awards ==
- 2010: first place in the U20 Absolute Uruguayan Championship.
- 2011: third place in the South American Zonal Championship 2.5.
- 2011: Female International Master.
- 2012: twelfth place in the Absolute Uruguayan Championship.
- 2014: ninth place in the Absolute Uruguayan Championship.
- 2007; 2008; 2009; 2010; 2012; 2013; 2014: first place in the Uruguayan Women's Championship.
