= 327 Columbia =

Main-belt asteroid

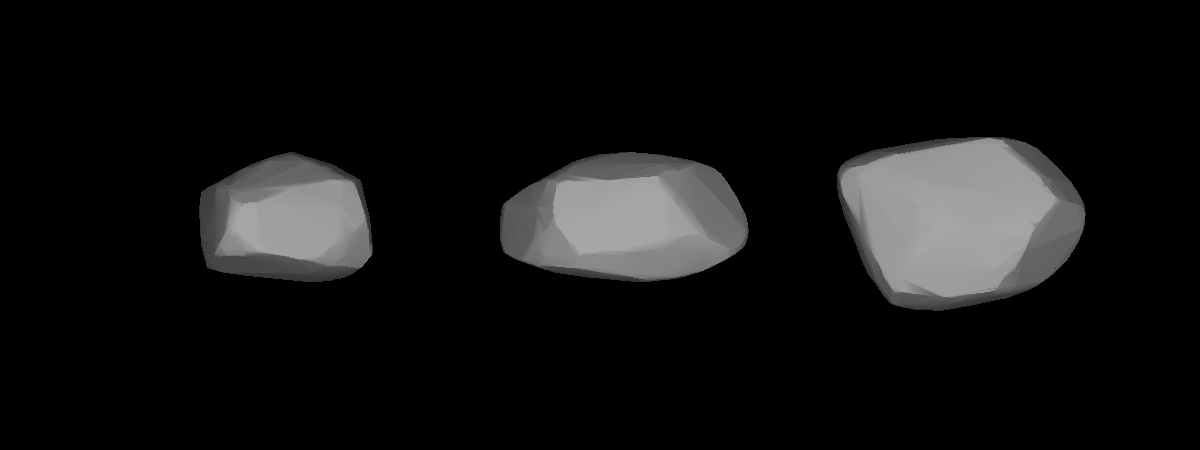
- Lightcurve-based 3D model of 327 Columbia

Discovery
- Discovered by: A. Charlois
- Discovery site: Nice Obs.
- Discovery date: 22 March 1892

Designations
- Pronunciation: /kəˈlʌmbiə/
- Named after: Christopher Columbus (Italian explorer)
- Alternative designations: 1934 JN
- Minor planet category: main-belt · (middle)

Orbital characteristics
- Epoch 16 February 2017 (JD 2457800.5)
- Uncertainty parameter 0
- Observation arc: 124.62 yr (45,519 days)
- Aphelion: 2.9496 AU
- Perihelion: 2.6066 AU
- Semi-major axis: 2.7781 AU
- Eccentricity: 0.0617
- Orbital period (sidereal): 4.63 yr (1,691 days)
- Mean anomaly: 255.97°
- Mean motion: 0° 12^{m} 46.44^{s} / day
- Inclination: 7.1462°
- Longitude of ascending node: 354.82°
- Argument of perihelion: 306.18°

Physical characteristics
- Dimensions: 26.13±2.8 km 26.17±0.66 km 26.24 km (derived); 30.291±4.049 km
- Synodic rotation period: 5.93±0.05 h 5.93183±0.00005 h 5.9320±0.0006 h
- Geometric albedo: 0.214±0.339; 0.2360±0.061; 0.250±0.015; 0.2565 (derived)
- Spectral type: SMASS = Sl · S
- Absolute magnitude (H): 9.88 · 10.0 · 10.10 · 10.19±0.01

327 Columbia is a stony asteroid from the middle region of the asteroid belt, approximately 26 kilometers in diameter. It was discovered on 22 March 1892, by French astronomer Auguste Charlois at Nice Observatory in southeast France. It is named after Christopher Columbus (1451–1506).

== Description ==
Columbia orbits the Sun at a distance of 2.6–2.9 AU once every 4 years and 8 months (1,691 days). Its orbit has an eccentricity of 0.06 and an inclination of 7° with respect to the ecliptic. The body's observation arc begins the night after its official discovery at Nice.

== Physical characteristics ==
In the SMASS taxonomy, Columbia has been characterized as a Sl-type, an intermediary between the common S-type and rather rare L-type asteroids.

=== Rotation period and spin axis ===
In May 2003, a rotational lightcurve of Columbia was obtained by French amateur astronomer René Roy. It gave a rotation period of 5.93 hours with a brightness variation of 0.16 magnitude (U=2). In February 2007, photometric observations by his college Pierre Antonini gave a well defined period of 5.9320 hours and an amplitude of 0.42 (U=3).

In 2016, a modeled lightcurve was derived from various photometric database sources, giving a concurring period of 5.93183 hours and a spin axis of (52.0°, 43.0°) in ecliptic coordinates.

=== Diameter and albedo ===
According to the surveys carried out by the Infrared Astronomical Satellite IRAS, the Japanese Akari satellite, and NASA's Wide-field Infrared Survey Explorer with its subsequent NEOWISE mission, Columbia measures between 26.13 and 30.29 kilometers in diameter, and its surface has an albedo between 0.214 and 0.250. The Collaborative Asteroid Lightcurve Link derives an albedo of 0.2565 and a diameter of 26.24 kilometers using an absolute magnitude of 10.0.

== Naming ==
This minor planet was named in honor of Italian explorer Christopher Columbus (1451–1506), who reached the New World during his first voyage in 1492, instead of arriving at Japan as he had intended. The asteroid was named in 1892, on the occasion of the 400th anniversary of this historic discovery. Naming citation was first mentioned in The Names of the Minor Planets by Paul Herget in 1955 (H 37).
