= Luigi Colombo =

Italian track cyclist

Personal information
- Nationality: Italian
- Born: 19th century Milan, Italy
- Died: 20th century

Cycling career
- Sport: Cycling
- Disciplines: Track; Road
- Role: Rider

Amateur team
- 1895–1899: Forza e Coraggio, Milan

Major wins
- Florence–Viareggio (1894)
Medal record
Men's track cycling
Italian Championships
Gold medal – first place	1895	Motor-paced (amateurs)
Silver medal – second place	1895	Sprint
Silver medal – second place	1895	Tricycle
Silver medal – second place	1899	Sprint

Luigi Colombo was an Italian track and road racing cyclist. He competed in the late 19th century including at the 1900 Summer Olympics in Paris. He was a member of the Forza e Coraggio cycling club of Milan. In 1895, he won the Italian amateur motor-paced championship and finished second in the Italian sprint and tricycle championships. He also finished second in the Italian sprint championships in 1899.

== Biography ==
Colombo was a native from Milan. He competed for Forza e Coraggio, a sporting club based in Milan. He specialised in track cycling and participated in Italian cycling competitions during the 1890s but also competed in road cycling races.

In 1895, Colombo won the Italian track cycling title in the amateur motor-paced event. In the same year, he finished second in the Italian sprint championships and the Italian tricycle championships. Four years later, he again placed second in the 1899 Italian sprint championships finishing behind Antonio Restell.

Colombo represented Italy in track cycling at the 1900 Summer Olympics in Paris. He competed in the sprint event and the points race event. In the men's sprint, Colombo was eliminated in the first round, finishing fourth in heat seven. In the men's points race, he finished equal 12th.

Colombo was also active as a road cyclist. He achieved several road racing wins in Tuscany, where he lived for an extended period, including Florence–Viareggio in 1894.
