= Columbus (Herzogenberg) =

1870 composition by Heinrich von Herzogenberg

Columbus is an 1870 composition by Heinrich von Herzogenberg. A large scale cantata in Wagnerian style it was premiered at the Graz Music Society Concert Hall on 4 December 1870.

== Recording ==
- Andrè Schuen, Michael Schade, Markus Butter, Chor der Oper Graz, Philharmonisches Orchester Graz, Dirk Kaftan CPO 2017
