= Columbus Township, Johnson County, Missouri =

Township in Johnson County, Missouri, U.S.

Coordinates: 38.8586899°N 93.8962336°W

Columbus Township is an inactive township in Johnson County, in the U.S. state of Missouri. Township was established in 1870, taking its name from the community of Columbus, Missouri.
