= Columbus Avenue =

Columbus Avenue may refer to:

- Columbus Avenue (Boston)
- Columbus Avenue (Manhattan)
- Columbus Avenue (San Francisco)
- Columbus Avenue Cable Line, M7 (New York City bus)
- Columbus Avenue Historic District, in Sandusky, Ohio
