= Columbus Township =

Columbus Township may refer to:

- Columbus Township, Adams County, Illinois
- Columbus Township, Bartholomew County, Indiana
- Columbus Township, Luce County, Michigan
- Columbus Township, St. Clair County, Michigan
- Columbus Township, Anoka County, Minnesota, now the city of Columbus
- Columbus Township, Johnson County, Missouri
- Columbus Township, Platte County, Nebraska
- Columbus Township, Warren County, Pennsylvania
