= Christopher Columbus (1904 film) =

1903 French silent short film

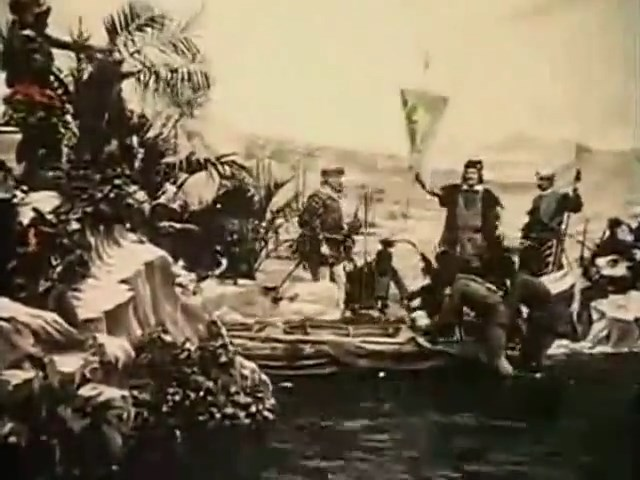
- Christopher Columbus landing in America
- French: Christophe Colomb
- Directed by: Vincent Lorant-Heilbronn (fr)
- Production company: Pathé Frères
- Distributed by: Pathé Company
- Release date: 1904
- Running time: 12 minutes
- Country: France

Christopher Columbus (French: Christophe Colomb), also known as The European Idea of Christopher Columbus Discovering America, is a 1904 French silent short film directed by Vincent Lorant-Heilbronn (fr). The film is one of the oldest surviving example of the historical drama genre.

== Plot ==
The film is described in the Pathé catalogue as a Historical Scene in 8 tableaux:

1. Mutiny at Sea.
2. Landing in America.
3. Indians Rejoicing.
4. Triumphal Entry into Barcelona.
5. Reception at the Spanish Court.
6. Christopher Columbus disgraced.
7. Christopher Columbus in prison.
8. To the glory of Christopher Columbus.

== Distribution ==
After its initial release in France on 24 April 1904, the film was distributed during the same year in the USA by Pathé Frères, by the Edison Manufacturing Company, by the Kleine Optical Company (1904) and by the Lubin Manufacturing Company.

== Analysis ==
The film is composed of 8 single-shot scenes introduced by intertitles. All shots are wide shots of theatre-like sets filmed by a frontal static camera.

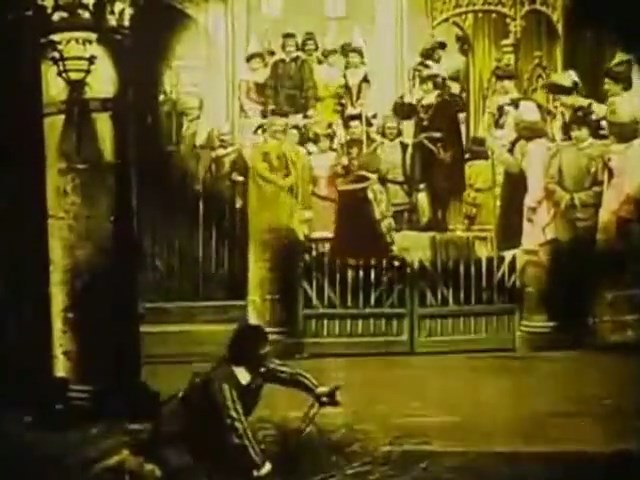
Christopher Columbus in jail, reminiscing
1. Mutiny at Sea. A group of men gesticulating on a set representing a ship shaken by a storm.
2. Landing in America. A shore with rocks to the left. Christopher Columbus is welcomed by natives as he disembarks from a boat.
3. Indians Rejoicing. A clearing in a tropical forest. A group of natives welcome Christopher Columbus and his soldiers. They exchange presents and the natives stage a dance for him.
4. Triumphal Entry into Barcelona. A crowd in front of a city gate. Christopher Columbus enters on horseback, saluting the crowd. He dismounts and flowers are offered to him.
5. Reception at the Spanish Court. A large room in a palace, with the King and Queen of Spain sitting on a throne. Christopher Columbus enters, preceded by heralds. He kneels in front of the King who bestows an award upon him. He introduces to the King native Americans who kneel in front of him.
6. Christopher Columbus in disgrace. The cloister of a monastery. A group of monks enter and bow before the cross. The King enters and talks to one of the monks. Christopher Columbus enters and begs the King follows. He points to the cross and follow the monks as they exit the cloister, leaving Christopher Columbus kneeling in front of the cross.
7. Christopher Columbus in prison. A dungeon with Christopher Columbus sitting on a straw bedding. The King enters accompanied by monks and guards and Christopher Columbus begs him for mercy. The King hesitates but finally runs out of the cell. A matte double exposure shot shows Christopher Columbus thoughts: another view of scene 5. He falls on the ground unconscious when the vision dissipates.
8. To the fame of Christopher Columbus. Apotheosis. The last scene takes us to another time and place. Its allegorical nature and the presence of various flags and uniforms indicate that it aims at representing how highly Christopher Columbus was regarded in the Western World at the beginning of the 20th century.
