= Lu Colombo =

Italian singer

- Born: Maria Luisa Colombo; 3 July 1952 (age 73)
- Origin: Milan, Italy
- Genres: Italo disco
- Occupation: Singer
- Years active: 1980–present
- Labels: Carosello Records, EMI Italiana, UP Art Records
- Website: http://www.lucolombo.it/

Lu Colombo, best known as Lou Colombo, pseudonym of Maria Luisa Colombo (Milan, 3 July 1952), is an Italian singer-songwriter, producer and publisher, widely known for the song Maracaibo.

== Life and career ==
Lu Colombo was born into a family of art and music lovers. Encouraged by her mother and father, she began experimenting with music and painting as a young child, later pursuing classical studies and earning a degree in literature. In the sixties, she started singing and playing guitar, recording as a backing vocalist with the band Stormy Six and as a member of the trio Plastic Doves. In the seventies, she entered the theatre scene, writing and editing soundtracks, as well as working in a music and film editing studio and composing and performing advertising jingles. In the same period, she worked at a music magazine as a graphic designer and as an assistant to the photographer Giovanni Molino.

In 1981, she released the single Maracaibo on the Carosello label. In 1982, the song was mixed by Tony Carrasco and rereleased on Moon Records, along with her other single Skipper. In 1983, she signed a contract with the Italian EMI label and released the single Dance All Nite, performing it at the 1983 edition of Festivalbar, a popular live-music performance television show, and winning the Disco Estate song competition. Dance All Nite and Maracaibo were both featured in the soundtrack for the film Vacanze di Natale (1983, dir. Carlo Vanzina). In 1984, she returned to Festivalbar, performing her new song Aurora. In 1985, she was invited to Festivalbar again, after winning the Saint Vincent Festival, with her song Rimini Ouagadougou. In the late eighties, she slowly left the dance-music scene, and in the nineties, she moved abroad to dedicate herself to mural painting.

In 2001, Lu released the album Maracaibo 20th Anniversary for label Self Distribuzione, and in 2011 she released a reggae version of Maracaibo for a 30th Anniversary album. In 2004 she returned to writing and performing original music, joining Maurizio Geri on the swing album L'uovo di Colombo (Trimurti Records), as well as recording new versions of the songs Rimini-Ouagadougou and Gina. Lu premiered her new album at the Mantova Music Festival, at Midem, at Womex and at MEI. In 2008, she produced and performed 19 giorni e 600 notti (cover of 19 días y 500 noches by Joaquín Sabina) in Pan Brumisti’s album Quelle piccola cose, presented at the Tenco Award.

In 2009, she collaborated with the Brescian musical group The The on their album Lupai, consisting of dance covers from the sixties and seventies. The album was distributed on newsstands, and proceeds financed humanitarian initiatives in Guatemala and Ghana. In 2012, she released the album Molto più di un buon motivo (Artup Records), in which she interprets twelve songs by Joaquín Sabina, all translated into Italian by Sergio S. Sacchi of Club Tenco, including 19 giorni e 600 notti and an interpretation of De purisima y oro.

In 2014, Lu travelled to Barcelona, Spain, to join the group Tinta Roja for a concert in the program of Cose di Amilcaree, later meeting Joaquín Sabina in Madrid. Between 2010 and 2020, she performed in numerous events, concerts and projects, including a tribute to Gabriella Ferri recorded with the winds section of the alternative circus act Circo Paniko. She then composed the song Bambu balla with the accordionist Jovica Jovic, winning fifth place at the 2014 edition of Zecchino d'Oro, an international children's song competition. Lu also contributed to book/cd compilations Mutifilter and Ventanni di sessantotto for publisher Squilibri Editore, performing these songs in Florence and at the Palazzina Liberty in Milan. In 2016, she released the EP Basta with four songs on the subject of violence against women, including a translation and interpretation of I will survive by Gloria Gayner. While writing and performing this album, she participated in various social and humanitarian initiatives related to the struggle to end violence against women.

In early 2020, at the start of the COVID-19 lockdown in Milan, Italy, she composed, recorded, and published the song Ali ali, dedicated to all health workers saving lives and the public services fighting the virus, performing it from her balcony. A second version of this song, entitled Ali ali phase 2, was later recorded with Luca Pozzuoli. For 25 April 2020, the day of Italy's liberation and the end of World War II, she wrote the song Neve al sole in collaboration with Silvio Meazza, dedicating the piece to her father, who was a prisoner of war. Later that year she performed as percussionist on the song Danza featuring Tony Esposito. Since late-2020 she Lu has been collaborating with dj’s Max Monti and Claudio Coveri on a dance remix of her 80s’s hit Rimini Ouagadougou. It will be released in summer 2021.

== Discography ==
Singles

- 1981 – Maracaibo/Neon (Carosello, 7")
- 1982 – Skipper/Rio Rio (Moon Records, 7", 12")
- 1982 – Maracaibo(Tony Carrasco Mix)/Maracaibo(Tony Carrasco Mix/Instrumental) (Moon Records, 7", 12")
- 1983 – Dance All Nite/O Do Not Love Me to Long (EMI Italiana, 7")
- 1983 – Dance All Nite/Dance All Nite (Instrumental) (EMI Italiana, 12")
- 1984 – Aurora/Samba Calipso Tango (EMI Italiana, 7")
- 1984 – Aurora(Hot Version)/Samba Calipso Tango / Maracaibo (Emi Italiana, 12")
- 1985 – Rimini Ouagadougou/Punto Zero (EMI Italiana, 7")
- 1993 – Maracaibo/Neon|Maracaibo Remix 93 Nuda (Soul Xpression, 12")
- 2001 – Maracaibo/Neon|Maracaibo – 20th Anniversary (ICE Record, CD single)
- 2011 – Maracaibo reggae 30th Anniversary
- 2017 – La pansè (tribute to Gabriella Ferri)

LP

- 2003 – L'uovo di Colombo
- 2007 – Lupai (CD)
- 2012 – Molto più di un buon motivo
- 2016 – Basta
