= Luca Colombo (footballer) =

Italian retired football player

Personal information
- Full name: Luca Colombo
- Date of birth: 8 November 1984 (age 41)
- Place of birth: Sondrio, Italy
- Height: 1.88 m (6 ft 2 in)
- Position: Central defender

Youth career
- Olginatese
- 2003–2004: Internazionale

Senior career*
Years	Team	Apps	(Gls)
2004–2005	Sora	1	(0)
2005–2006	Oggiono	15	(2)
2006–2009	FC Chiasso	41	(4)
2009–2010	Sanluri	22	(1)
2010–2011	Fiorenzuola	32	(0)
2012–2017	Sondrio		

Managerial career
- 2017–2018: Sondrio
- 2018–2019: Stresa Sportiva
- * Club domestic league appearances and goals

Luca Colombo (born 8 November 1984 in Sondrio) is an Italian retired football player who played as a centre-back.

== Football career ==
Colombo started his career at Olginatese. In summer 2003, he was on loan to Internazionale youth team (under-20). Inter bought him a year later, but sold to Sora (Serie C1) in join-ownership bid. He played his only fully professional match on 13 March 2005 against Vis Pesaro.

In summer 2005, Sora got full ownership but he left for Oggiono of Serie D.

On 30 August 2006, Colombo transferred to FC Chiasso of Swiss Challenge League. He played 23 matches and scored 4 goals in the 2007–08 season.

From summer 2009, he played for Serie D team A.S.D. Sanluri Calcio, and from summer 2010, he played for Serie D team Fiorenzuola.

== Coaching career ==
After retiring in the summer 2017, Sora became the manager of Sondrio.

On 13 December 2018, Sora was appointed as the manager of Stresa Sportiva in the Italian Serie D. He was fired on 26 February 2019.
