= Bonava =

Swedish real estate company

Bonava AB
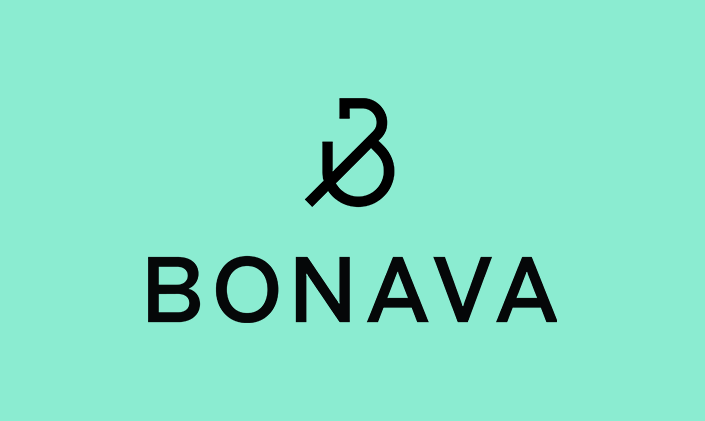
- Company type: Public
- Traded as: Nasdaq Stockholm Large Cap Nasdaq Stockholm: BONAV B
- ISIN: SE0008091573
- Industry: Real estate development
- Founded: 2016
- Headquarters: Stockholm, Sweden
- Number of locations: Sweden, Germany, Finland, Estonia, Latvia, Lithuania.
- Area served: Europe
- Key people: Peter Wallin CEO; Jon Johnsson (CFO)
- Revenue: SEK 8 billion (2024)
- Number of employees: 900 (2024)
- Website: www.bonava.com

Bonava is a residential developer in Northern Europe. The company develops housing in Germany, Sweden, Finland, Estonia, Latvia, and Lithuania. According to the company, it has built 40,000 homes since 2016.The name Bonava comes from the Swedish word "bo" which means living, and "nav" that means hub.

Bonava's shares and green bonds are listed on Nasdaq Stockholm. On 20 December 2023, Bonava AB announced the Board of Directors' resolution to carry out a fully underwritten rights issue. The rights issue was subscribed to approximately 170 per cent. As a result, the company will receive SEK 1,050 million before deductions for issuance costs.
