= Columbus (novel) =

1941 novel

- First edition
- Author: Rafael Sabatini
- Language: English
- Genre: Romantic adventure novel
- Publisher: Hutchinson
- Publication date: 1941

Columbus is a romantic adventure novel by the British writer Rafael Sabatini which was first published in 1941. It depicts the life of Christopher Columbus at the Spanish court, his voyages across the Atlantic Ocean in which he discovered the Americas and his relationship with the mother of his second son Beatriz Enríquez de Arana, whom he never married.

Sabatini had originally been commissioned to write a screenplay for a planned film of Columbus around 1939. The project was continually delayed, and in 1941 Sabatini published his story as a novel instead. The story is in the style of his previous works Captain Blood and The Sea Hawk, which had already been adapted into hit films, and portrayed Columbus as a swashbuckler.

== Film adaptation ==
In the late 1940s, the projected Columbus film was revived with strong support from the Rank Organisation who intended it as a prestige project targeted at the U.S. market. It was produced by Sydney Box and made in Technicolor with the American actor Fredric March cast as Columbus. Box was unhappy with Sabatini's script, which he considered historically inaccurate and overly romantic. Box and his wife Muriel Box extensively rewrote the screenplay aiming at greater realism at the expense of Sabatini's swashbuckling style. On its release, the film was poorly received by critics and was unsuccessful at the box office.
