= Susanna Fontanarossa =

Mother of Christopher Columbus

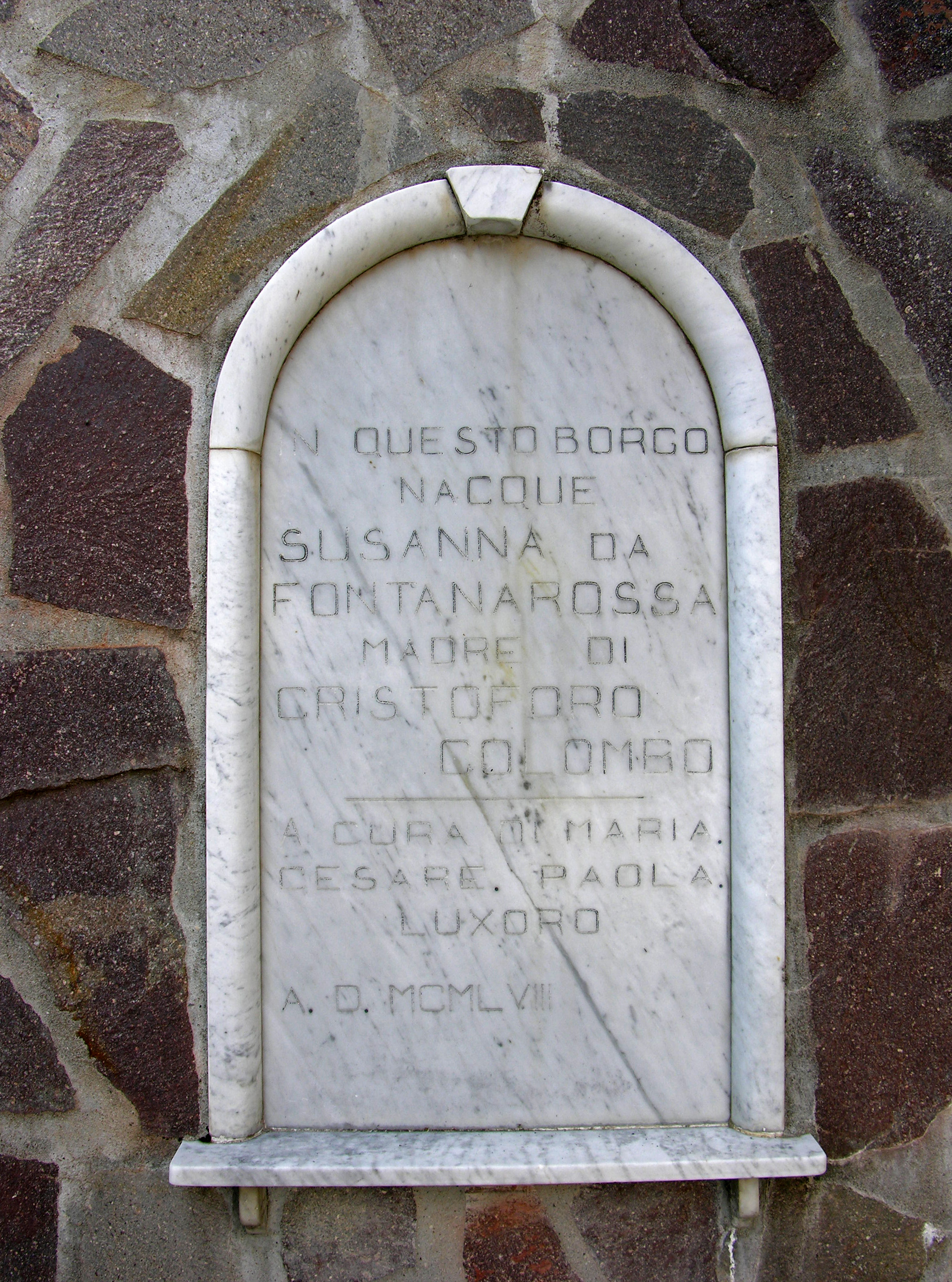
- Plaque dedicated to Susanna Fontanarossa in Gorreto
- Born: 1435; Monticellu, Republic of Genoa
- Died: 1489 (aged 53–54)
- Spouse: Domenico Colombo (m. 1445)
- Children: 5, including Christopher and Bartholomew Columbus
- Father: Giacometti Fontanarossa
- Relatives: Diego Columbus (grandson); Ferdinand Columbus (grandson)

Susanna Fontanarossa (Ligurian: Suzanna Fontann-arossa; 1435–1489) was the mother of navigator and explorer Christopher Columbus.

== Biography ==
Susanna was born in the hillside village of Monticellu, on the then-Genoese island of Corsica, to a wealthy Catholic family. She was the daughter of Giacomo "Giacometti" Fontanarossa. Her family owned substantial real estate in Quezzi, a little village in the low-lying valley of Bisagno (part of the present-day city of Genoa). She married Domenico Colombo in 1445 and bore him 5 children: Cristoforo, Bartolomeo, Giovanni, Giacomo, and a daughter named Bianchinetta.

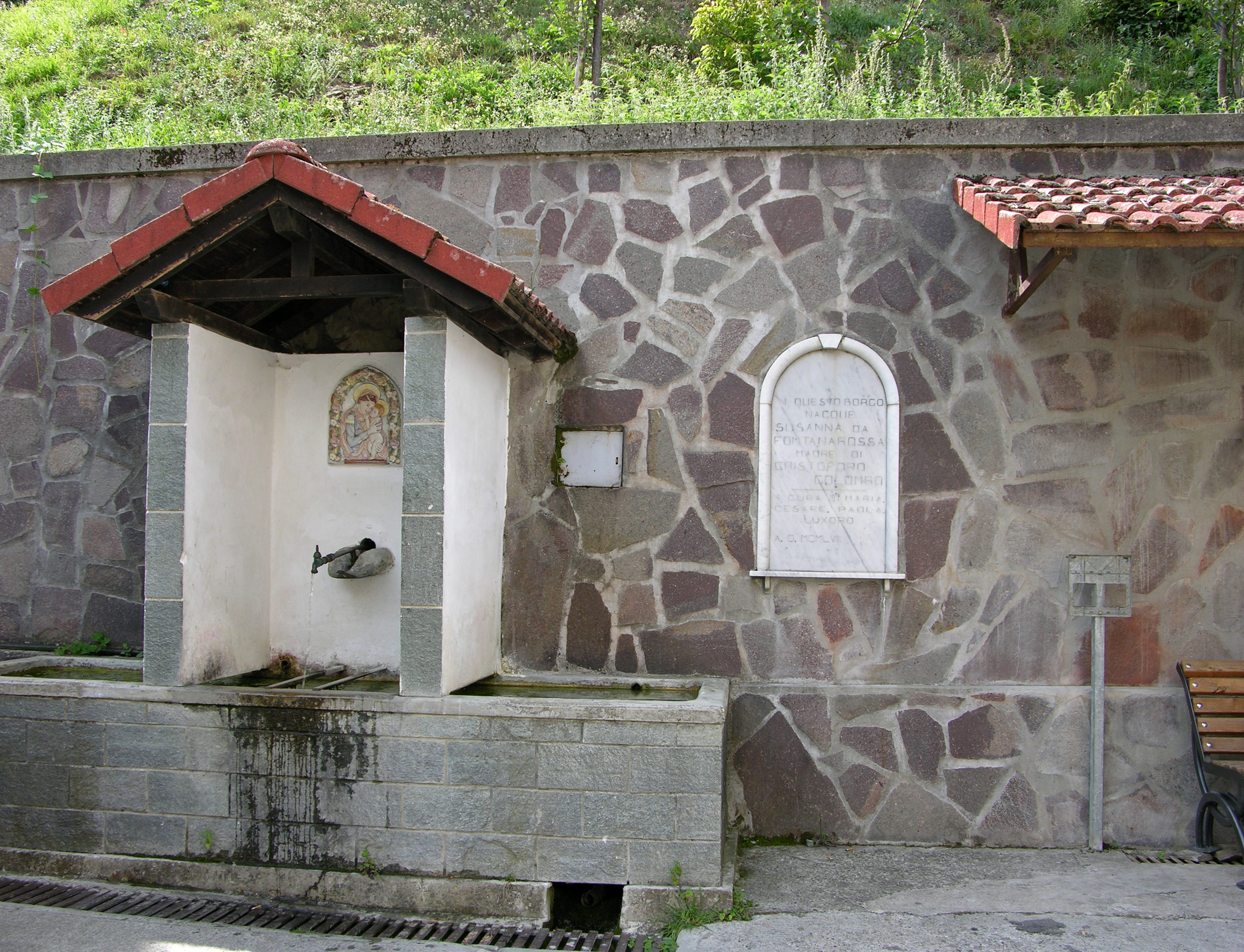
Commemorative marble plaque to Suzanna Fontanarossa in the village of Fontanarossa. The inscription reads In questo borgo nacque Susanna Fontanarossa, madre di Cristoforo Colombo ("Susanna Fontanarossa, the mother of Christopher Columbus, was born in this village"). Erected 1958.

A notarised document of sale in the State Archives of Genoa contains the Latin text: Sozana, (quondam) de Jacobi de Fontana Rubea, uxor Dominici de Columbo de Ianua ac Christophorus et Pelegrinus filii eorum, "Susanna was (the daughter) of Giacomo from Fontanarossa of the Bisagno, wife of Domenico Columbus from Genoa, their sons are Cristoforo and Pellegrino." The Val Bisagno was a significant inland district in the ancient Republic of Genoa including the valley of the Bisagno. Thus she was described as 'Susanna from Fontanarossa' within the Val Bisagno, rather than Suzanna Fontarossa.

Today, the hilltop village of Fontanarossa (frazione of Gorreto, Genoa, Liguria), in the Val Trebbia (31 km inland from Genoa, at 44°35′10.66″N 9°15′18.80″E) and only 6 km beyond the watershed of the river Bisagno, has a marble stone with the inscription In questo borgo nacque Susanna Fontanarossa, madre di Cristoforo Colombo ("Susanna Fontanarossa, the mother of Christopher Columbus, was born in this village").

Little is known about her after 1484. She died before her husband, Domenico.
