= Governor Columbus =

Governor Columbus may refer to:

- Bartholomew Columbus (1460s–1515), Governor of Santo Domingo in the 1490s
- Christopher Columbus (1451–1506), 1st Governor of the Indies from 1492 to 1499
- Diego Columbus (died 1526), 4th Governor of the Indies from 1509 to 1518
