= Museum of Italian Contemporary Art in America =

Costa Rican contemporary art museum

- Museo d'arte contemporanea italiana in America
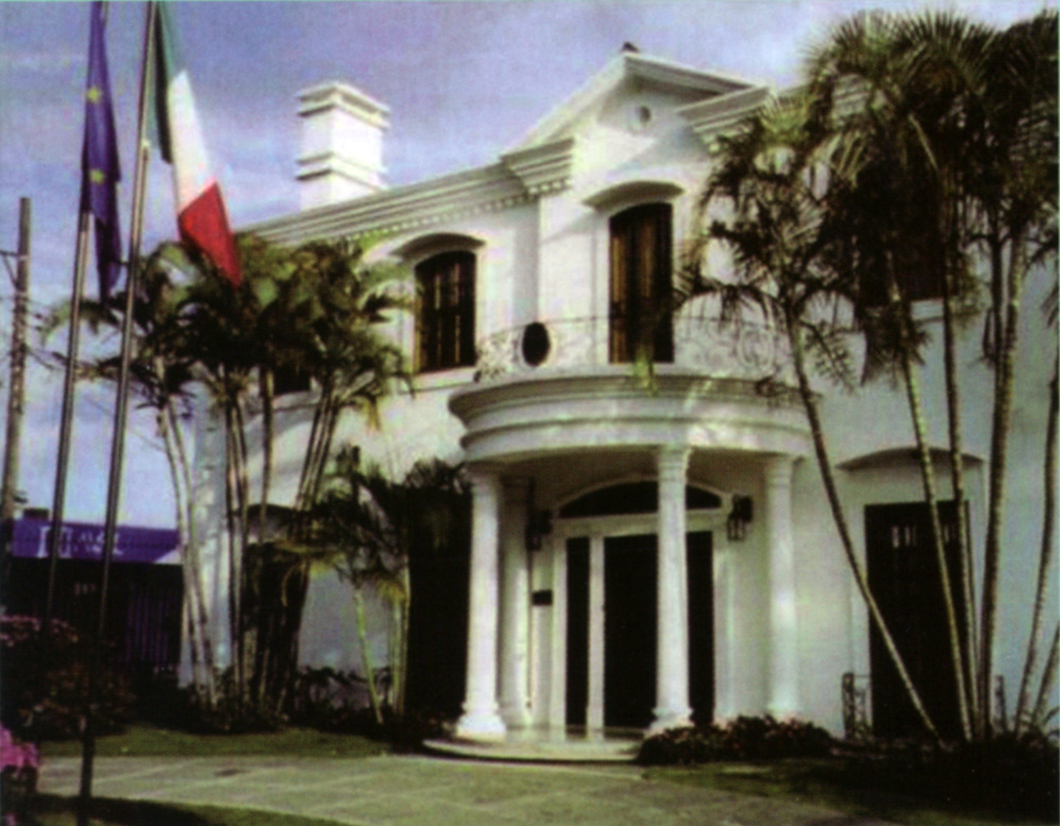
- Established: 2004
- Location: San Jose, Costa Rica
- Coordinates: 9.9350°N 84.0940°W
- Type: Art museum
- Collections: Contemporary Italian art

The Museum of Italian Contemporary Art in America (Italian: Museo d'arte contemporanea italiana in America) (MACIA) is located in San José, Costa Rica, at the chancellery of the Italian Embassy.

== History ==
The museum opened in 2004 following its conceptualization in 2002, on the occasion of the exhibition set up for the celebrations of the 500th anniversary of the fourth voyage of Christopher Columbus, thanks to the collaboration between art historian Gregorio Rossi and ambassador Gioacchino Carlo Trizzino.

The Italian Embassy in San José has since hosted the first part of the works, which constitute a permanent collection of the museum.
