= Fourth voyage of Columbus =

Spanish maritime expedition, 1502–1504

Coordinates: 16°N 81°W

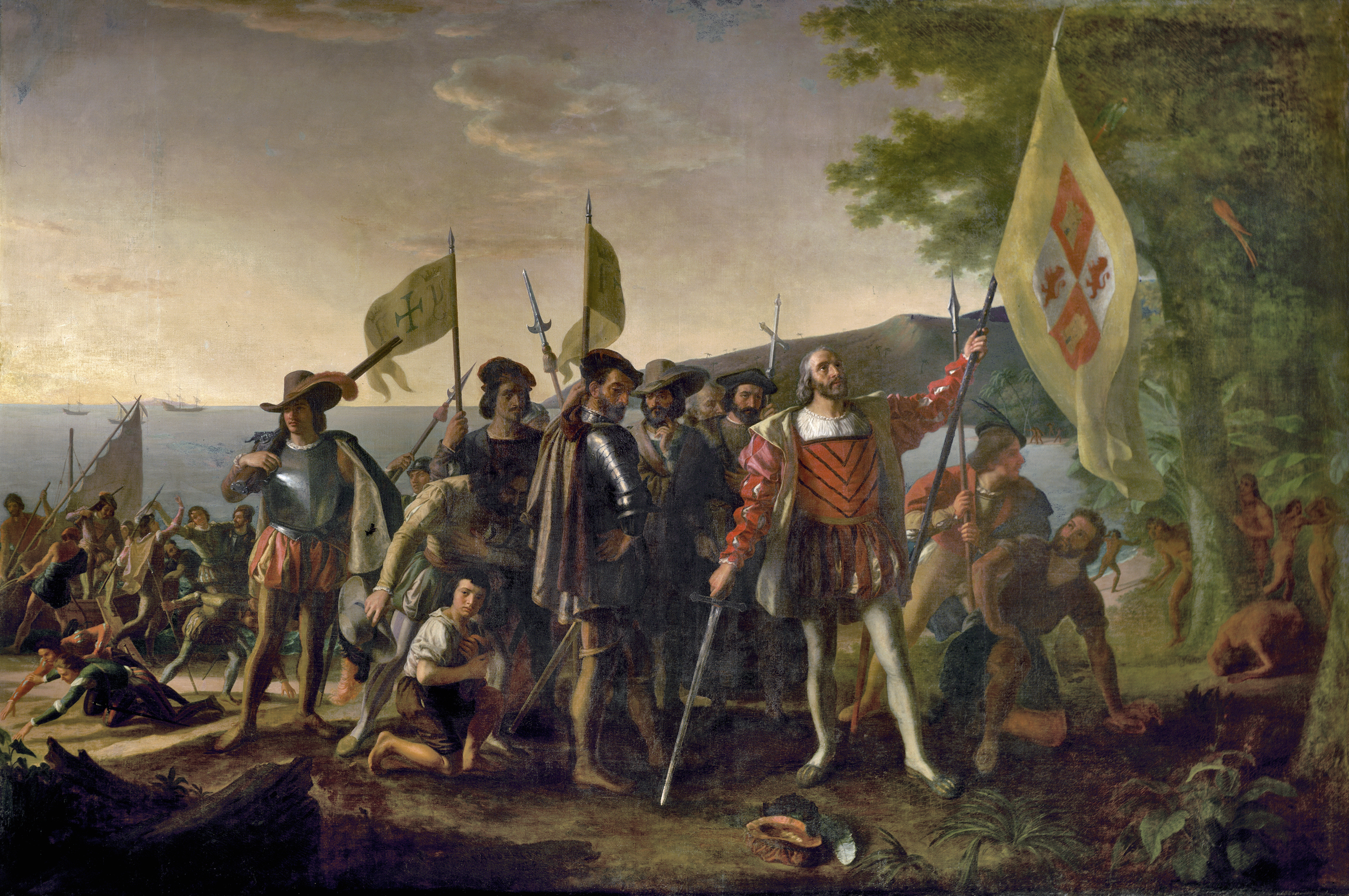
- Landing of Columbus by John Vanderlyn, 1847
- Sponsor: Catholic Monarchs
- Country: Castile or Aragon
- Leader: Christopher Columbus
- Start: Cádiz; 6–11 May 1502
- End: Sanlúcar de Barrameda; 7 November 1504
- Goal: To discover a western maritime route to the Far East
- Ships: Capitana; Santiago; Gallego; Vizcaíno (Note: See ships here for details.)
- Crew: 138–152 men (Note: Including ship's boys. Excluding pressed Amerindian crew.)
- Fatalities: 33–34 men (Note: Excluding Amerindian deaths.)
- Achievements: Non-Amerindian discovery of mainland Middle America; First non-Amerindian crossing of the Caribbean Sea; First non-Amerindian survey of Mosquito Gulf and eastern Honduras Bay; First non-Amerindian contact with the Maya (Note: Contested; see mainland here for details.)

Route

The fourth voyage of Columbus (Note: Also last for fourth, expedition for voyage, and several variations on of Columbus, like Columbian or Columbus's. Dubbed El Alto Viaje by Columbus.) was a Spanish maritime expedition of discovery in 1502 to 1504 to the western Caribbean coast of Central America, led by Christopher Columbus and commissioned by the Catholic Monarchs of Spain. The voyage, Columbus's last, was meant to find a western maritime route to the Far East. The journey failed to locate such passage, returned relatively little profit, and further resulted in the deaths of about a fifth of the fleet's company, loss of all four of its ships, and a year-long marooning in Jamaica from mid-1503. It is considered the non-Amerindian discovery of mainland Middle America, and one of the first non-Amerindian, non-Norse discoveries of continental North America, after its original peopling and later Norse settlement.

Columbus reached mainland in mid-1502, and spent the next ten months coasting southwards in the Bay of Honduras and Mosquito Gulf, along what is now Honduras, Nicaragua, Costa Rica and Panama. This leg notably involved first contact with various Amerindian peoples, possibly including the Maya civilisation, and ended when open hostilities broke out with Quibían, a cacique whose cacicazgo lay near the Belen River of modern Panama. The closing leg, a stranding in Jamaica, was prolonged by political tensions between the admiral and the governor of La Española, Nicolás de Ovando. It notably involved a widespread mutiny that required armed conflict to suppress, and a lunar eclipse that was used by Columbus to gain Taino aid.

== Background ==
Upon landing at Nueva Isabela in August, inquisitor Francisco de Bobadilla had Columbus and his brother arrested (shown) and transported back home by October 1500 (1594 de Bry sketch)

Christopher Columbus returned to Nueva Isabela, on Rio Ozama in La Española, upon completing his third voyage in 1500. The admiral and governor, whose relationship with local vecinos had been long strained by then, soon found himself on remand in Cádiz, awaiting an audience before the Catholic Monarchs to answer for alleged offences against the Spanish crown. His defence proved good enough to earn him his freedom, but not a reinstatement as governor of La Española, in which office he had first been replaced by juez pesquisidor ('inquisitor') Francisco de Bobadilla, and who would soon be succeeded by Nicolás de Ovando in 1502.

Upon his release from jail on 17 December 1500, Columbus set about planning what he proposed would be "his most significant, most profitable expedition yet". The recent Portuguese discovery of an eastern sea lane to "the opulent East", by Vasco da Gama in 1497 to 1499, had steeled the admiral's resolve to find a shorter, more direct western route to the same (to Cathay, Cipangu and La Especiería in the Far East, and to the neighbouring East Indies). Consequently, on 26 February 1502, Columbus petitioned the crown for a capitulación (Note: 'Letters patent by the Spanish crown authorising an expedition of discovery or conquest'.) to embark on a fourth voyage to the western half of the North Sea. Passage to the east, he figured, might lie farther west than anyone had prior sailed. The project being deemed feasible and desirable, the Catholic Monarchs granted his petition on 14 March. The royal licence approved the disbursement of some 10,000 gold pesos (Note: Possibly meaning gold specie worth 10,000 pesos, or else that sum in pesos de oro or de mina, or in excelentes.) for fitting out a fleet, appointed Francisco de Porras as comptroller of spoils, and Diego de Porras as auditor and crown representative, and forbade the enslavement of Amerindians, among further terms and conditions. Columbus enlisted Diego Tristán to captain his flagship La Capitana, Francisco de Porras for El Santiago de Palos, Pedro de Terreros for El Gallego, and Bartolomeo Fieschi for El Vizcaíno.

Some 140 men and ship's boys were recruited to crew Columbus's fleet of four ships. By 28 April, upon finalising all preparations for his trip, the admiral reported an outlay of 2,259,239 maravedis, primarily on wages, rent, equipment and provisions.

== Voyage ==
Columbus had lived through two hurricanes (at sea in 1494, in Isabela in 1495; shown) when a third hurricane struck Nueva Isabela in July 1502 (1594 de Bry sketch)

The Columbian fleet set sail from Cádiz on 9 May 1502. After a brief detour to Arzila, on the Barbary Coast, which Ferdinand II had requested, the fleet called at El Hierro, in the Canary Islands, to revictual. They next stopped in Martinique, after a transatlantic crossing of 21 days, the fastest one of Columbus's career.

Once his crew were rested and his ships repaired, the admiral departed from the Lesser Antilles, setting course due west. Though his capitulación barred Columbus from landing in La Española during the opening leg of his voyage, towards the end of June, the explorer nonetheless dropped anchor just off the mouth of Río Ozama, intending to request an emergency exemption to the said stipulation, so as to shelter his fleet in the port of Nueva Isabela, fearing that a hurricane was brewing and would soon strike the Greater Antilles. Not convinced by said plea, governor de Ovando denied the admiral's request and required the ships to clear the harbour. Columbus's fears soon proved well-founded though, as a "massive hurricane" next landed on the Spanish settlement and island in early July, one which the Columbian fleet weathered reasonably well, having secured shelter in some nearby anchorage, possibly off Río Jaina, just a few miles west of Ozama.

On 15 July, once the storm had passed and any damage been repaired, Columbus set off downwind from La Española. The fleet stopped briefly in Isla de Pinos, just off Isla Juana, then picked up some stiff northeasterlies and sailed due southwest.

=== Mainland ===
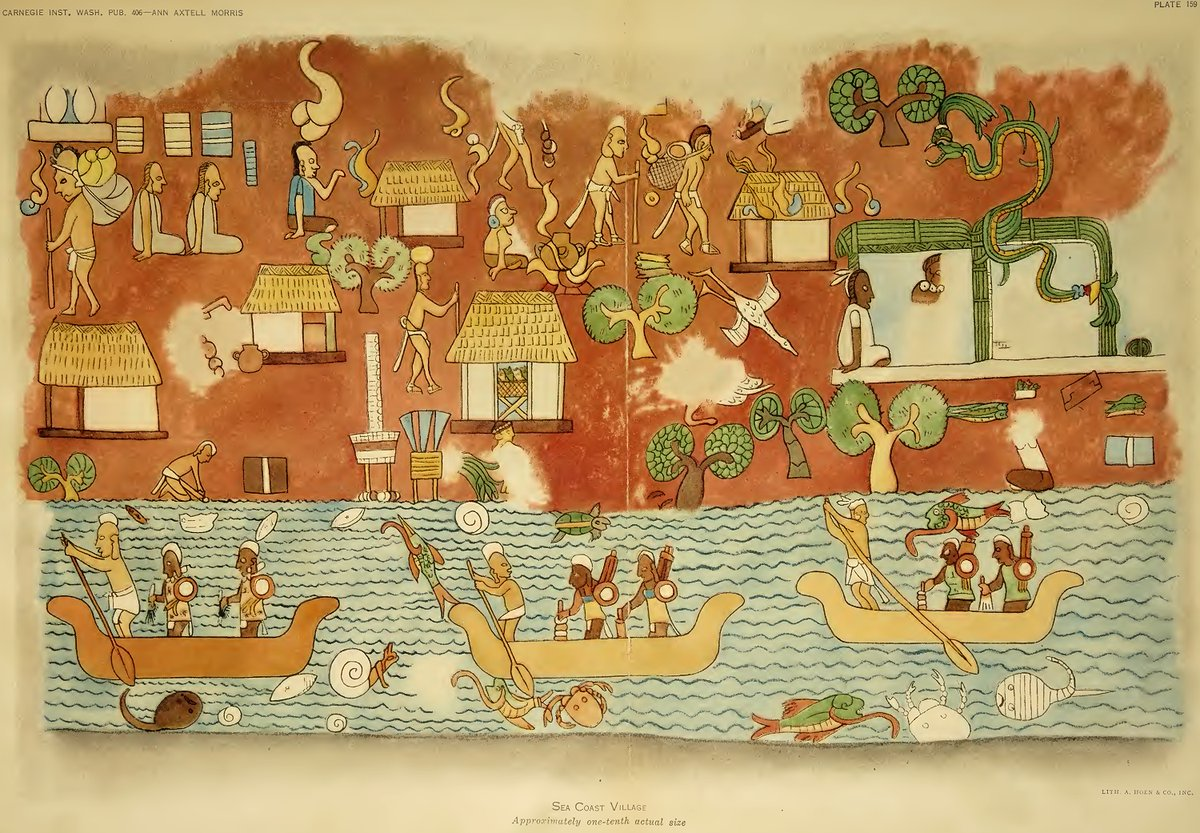
Maya coastal village (top) and laden merchant canoes (bottom) on trade routes skirting Yucatan in the Maya Lowlands (Postclassic mural in Chichen Itza; 1931 Morris sketch)

Local Amerindian ritual feast in 16th century Spanish Nicaragua (1594 de Bry sketch)

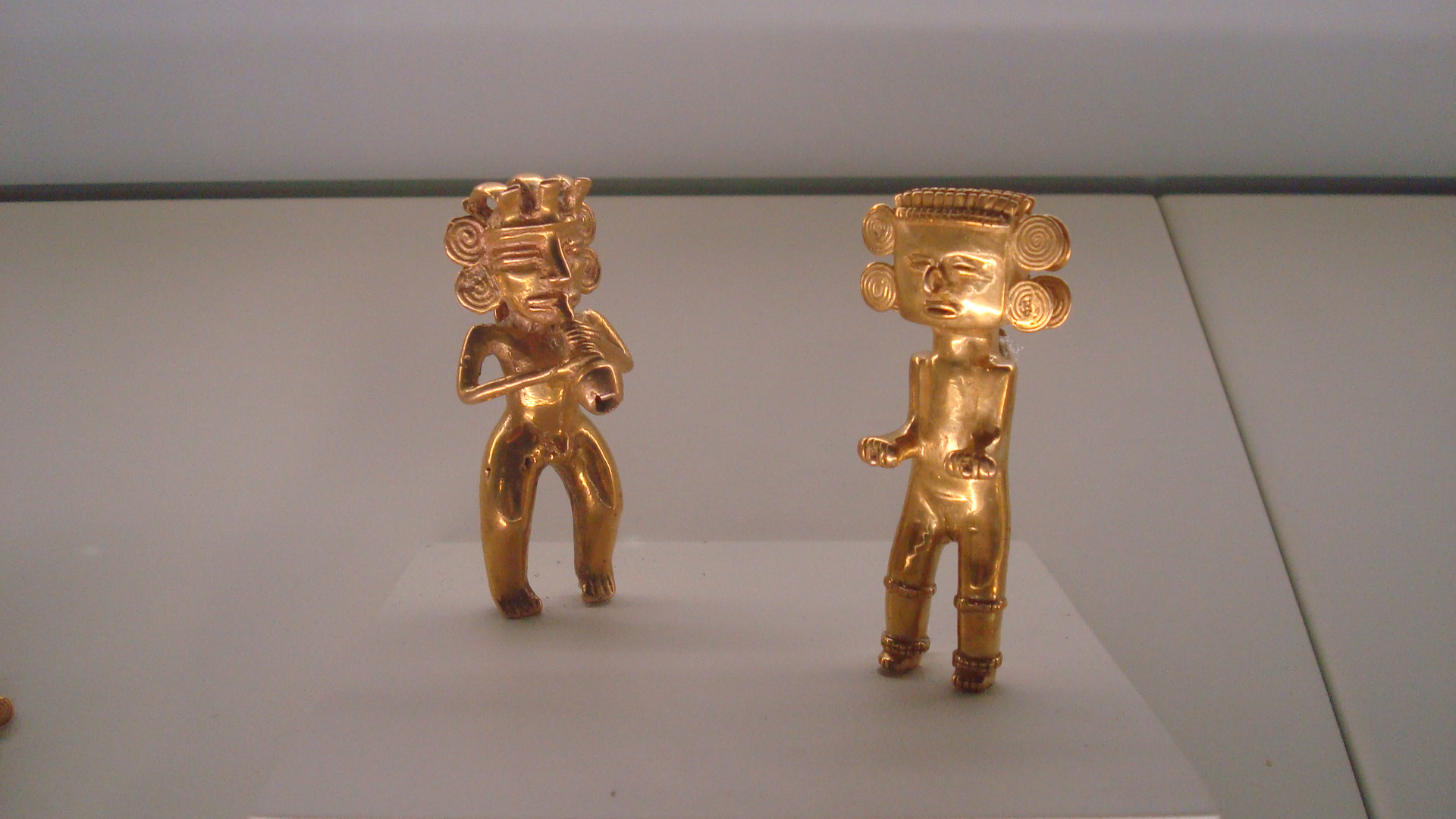
Quimbaya artefacts of gold recovered from the inner Mosquito Gulf (now in the Pre-Columbian Gold Museum in San José, Costa Rica)

The Columbian fleet sighted land on 30 July 1502, in what would later become the Bay of Honduras, and came upon an island which Columbus dubbed Isla de Pinos, later rechristened by the Spanish as Guanaxa. Shortly upon stopping here, an Amerindian canoe, richly laden in merchandise, approached their anchorage. Noting that the laden goods were "all of a quality superior to what they had seen before" in the New World, the Spaniards forced a trade, bartering the local merchant's ceramics, dyed cotton textiles, flint-edged swords and copper hatchets for "the usual baubles" from the Old World. This merchant canoe is thought to have hailed from some nearby port in the Maya Lowlands, leading some later historians and Mayanist scholars to identify the same as a Maya vessel, thereby making this chance encounter the first contact between the Maya civilisation and a non-Amerindian people.

After impressing the canoe's elderly skipper, Columbus weighed anchor and carried on southwards, reaching a small peninsula (named Punta Caxinas (Note: Now Punta Castilla, Cabo de Honduras or Cabo Honduras. See Cabo Honduras.) by the admiral) which abutted the bay of what would later be Truxillo. The ships were anchored in the lee of said cape, whereupon the Spanish explorers "made the first landing on the mainland of North America", this being the earliest instance any non-Amerindian people coming onto continental Middle America, and the first in the continent since Norse arrival. The Columbian expedition carried on to the east, and next reached the nearby Río Romano, where "Columbus took formal possession" of the newly discovered (to them) lands on 17 August. The weather, which now beset them with strong headwinds and fierce rain, prolonged the fleet's southeasterly leg to Cabo Gracias a Dios (lit. 'Cape Thank God'), so christened because when they rounded it on 14 September, and thus entered what would later be the Mosquito Gulf, the weather suddenly improved as if by divine providence.

On 16 September, two days after rounding Gracias a Dios, the fleet anchored just off a large estuary to the south, "probably the Rio Grande", with surf so strong it swamped one of the vessels, causing two crewmates to drown and die. On 25 September, they moored in a natural harbour in what is now Limón, Costa Rica, and again sought to barter with the locals, who were probably Talamancans, further impressing two of them to help with Amerindian language translations. On 5 October, they entered Bahía del Almirante, to the lee side of what are now the Bocas del Toro islands, where Columbus "found the first sign of fine gold, which an Indian wore like a large medal on his breast". The Spanish men next anchored in the neighbouring Laguna de Chiriquí, which their pressed Talamancan interpreters informed them was a nine days' march (across the isthmus) from Ciguare, a rich land which lay on another ocean (the South Sea). Columbus mistook the Talamancans to mean Ciamba, in the Far East, but the renewed hope of a passage to the east apparently did nothing for the admiral, who by this point in his expedition had seemingly given up on the search, having had no luck so far, and chosen instead to focus on trading for gold, which the lagoon's locals seemed to have in fine specimens.

The Spanish ships put out on 17 October, heading east of Chiriquí, and next sighted the local Amerindian settlement of Veragua, which their local guides (Note: Pressed Amerindian crew, or voluntary Amerindian guides.) identified as a renowned source of gold. At this point though, a storm blew the fleet eastwards to Porto Bello, and then farther east to Nombre de Dios, where the crew now dropped anchor to repair the damage. To their misfortune, the weather only worsened, as tempest-force winds and currents now battered the ships back and forth between Porto Bello and Río Chagres. Conditions finally improved on 3 January 1503, allowing the Spanish to sail back west for Río Belén, where they anchored some days later. From said Belén anchorage, Columbus now led an exploratory party up said river, while his brother Bartholomew led another detachment to Río Veragua.

In February, "the Spanish put up ten or twelve houses on the west bank of the river" of Belén, thereby founding Santa María de Belén. This soon proved an unwelcome development amongst the locals though, with whom relations quickly soured to the point of open hostilities. Seeking to stave off an armed assault, Columbus authorised the abduction of cacique Quibían, and his family and principal subordinates. The pre-emptive strike, led by Bartholomew and eighty men, proved both successful and profitable, netting the expeditionaries "a good deal of gold". The cacique soon managed to escape however, and responded with a force of some four hundred infantry from his cacicazgo. Though the Columbian crew managed to repel the attack, they suffered twelve fatal and several non-fatal casualties. Growing convinced of Santa María's untenable situation, Columbus now deemed it prudent to abandon his colonial project. Consequently, on 16 April, all ships but the now-decommissioned Gallego set off due east, with Diego Méndez succeeding the recently killed in action Diego Tristán as captain of the flagship Capitana. After scuttling the now-unseaworthy Vizcaíno at Porto Bello, the now-halved fleet reached a headland, probably Punta Mosquito in the Gulf of Darien, and set off northwards on 1 May.

=== Antilles ===
Columbus used a lunar eclipse in 1504 (shown) to trick the Taino of St Ann's into helping him (1881 Flammarion sketch)

Columbus (right) had to engage de Porras (left) to quell their mutiny in 1504 (1594 de Bry sketch)

The Columbian fleet, reduced now to the Capitana and Santiago, both already in a sorry state, dropped anchor in Jardines de la Reina, just off Isla Juana, on 12 May 1503. That week proved especially disastrous for the leaky caravels, and taxing for the crew. With "ships pierced by borers worse than a honeycomb, the people spiritless and desperate", they carried on southeastwards to Jamaica, reaching Saint Ann's Bay, just off the modern town of the same name, on 25 June. Being now indisputably beyond repair, Columbus condemned both caravels and had them beached for break up, thus marooning himself and the remaining company of 116 men for what would prove to be a year-long odyssey.

Columbus set about securing a vessel to send to Nueva Isabela for their rescue. That July 1503, he enlisted his captains Méndez and Fieschi, twelve crewmates, and twenty Taino rowers to attempt the daring crossing of the Jamaica Channel aboard dugout canoes in two flotillas. In three days' time, both parties reached Navassa Island, where several rowers died or fell very ill of dehydration. Despite these odds, the survivors made the rest of the crossing to La Española in one day's time. Upon reaching Jaragua though, the captains were promptly apprehended and detained by governor de Ovando, and so did not reach the port capital until March 1504. Their luck there did not improve though, as de Ovando now denied them the use of a small caravel for the needed rescue to the west, further prolonging the Columbian crew's marooning.

In the meantime, back in Saint Ann's, as it grew increasingly evident that no relief was forthcoming from the neighbouring Spanish island, the stranded crew's discontent festered until 2 January 1504, when brothers Francisco and Diego de Porras started a mutiny of 48 men. The mutineers fled ashore and marched towards the eastern end of Jamaica, much to the misfortune of any Taino settlements they crossed. In a similar vein, the Spanish in Saint Ann's now began overstaying their welcome, with the neighbouring Taino supplying markedly fewer provisions by February. Columbus had this sorted out in short order though, as during the total lunar eclipse of the night of 29 February to 1 March, he gathered an audience of local caciques and successfully convinced them that the moon's darkening was a sign of divine disapproval of their recent reticence. The de Porras brothers reached their destination as this happened, and like Méndez and Fieschi, also attempted to cross the channel for La Española, but failed both times and so were forced to march back to Saint Ann's by the end of March. A skirmish broke out on their arrival though, and it was won by the admiral and his crew, such that the insubordinate brothers were there arrested and charged with mutiny, though their followers were eventually pardoned. Finally, on 29 June, a rescue caravel from Nueva Isabela arrived at Saint Ann's, picked up the reunited Columbian crew, and brought them to the Spanish port, which they reached on 13 August.

On 12 September, Columbus, his son Ferdinand, his brother Bartholomew, and 22 crewmates departed Nueva Isabela as passengers on two outgoing caravels, reaching Sanlúcar de Barrameda on 7 November 1504. In Seville, the admiral informed Spanish authorities that the gold he had set aside for the quinto real, currently in his caravel's hold and soon due in port, had been prior adulterated without his connivance, for which intelligence he then claimed his lawful cut of the said earmarked cargo.

== Aftermath ==
Columbus's hopes to the contrary, this expedition proved to be "the least profitable and most dangerous of all his voyages", the admiral having found no passage to the Far East, returned a meagre profit to the Spanish crown, lost many men and all four ships, and suffered a year's marooning in Jamaica. The post-voyage debriefing of the Catholic Monarchs was precluded by the death of Isabella I on 26 November 1504. Instead, Columbus presented the expedition's negative results only to Ferdinand II that December in Segovia, with the latter proving less than thrilled, as the explorer reportedly "received nothing" from said king.

== Legacy ==
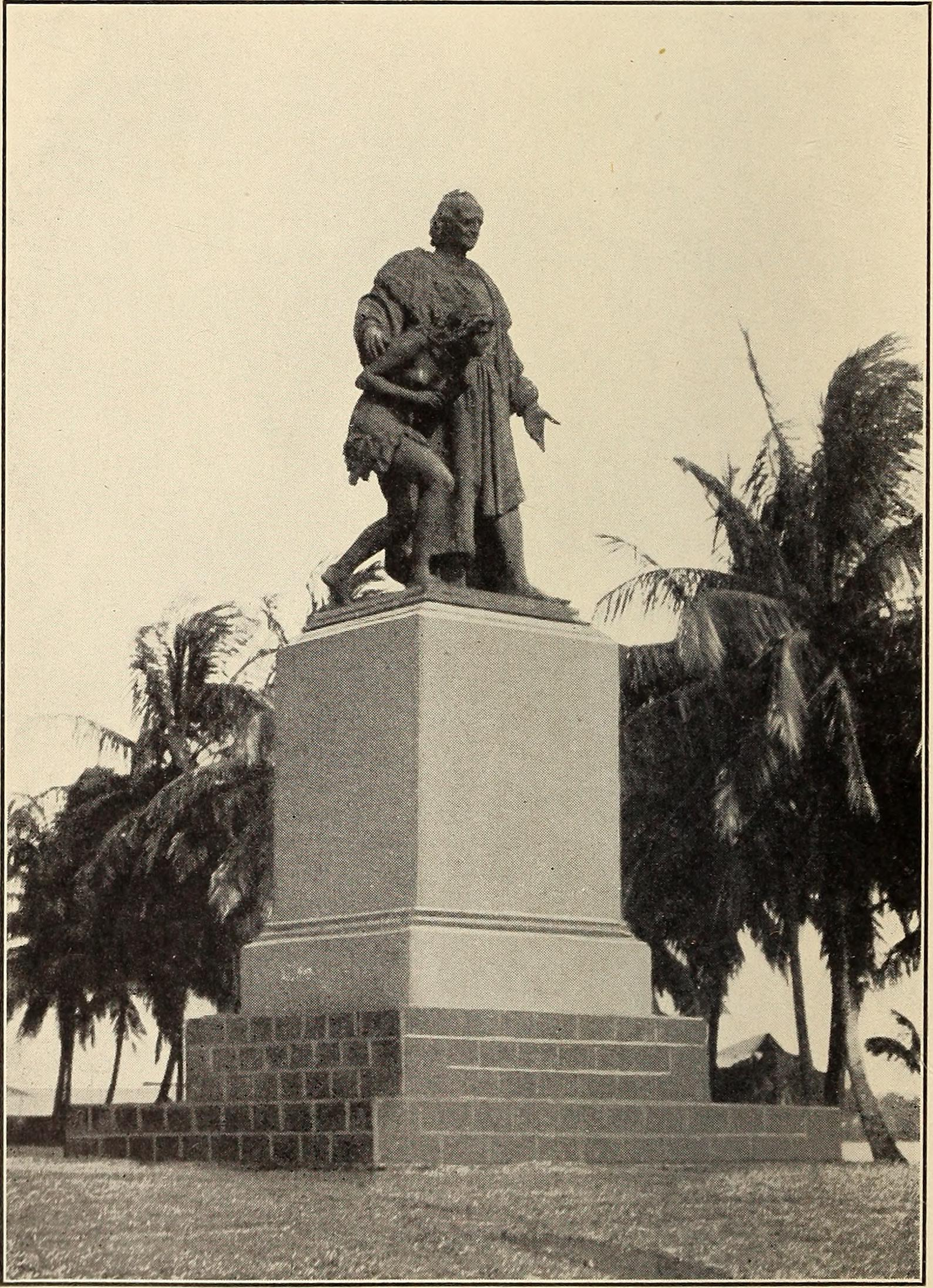
Bronze of a romanticised Columbus and a local Amerindian girl in modern Colón, Panama

Five first-hand accounts of this voyage survive, namely those by Columbus himself, his son Ferdinand (on the Capitana), the Porras brothers (the Santiago), Pedro de Ledesma (the Vizcaíno), and Diego Méndez (on the Santiago). Sixteenth century second-hand accounts in crónicas de Indias include one by Bartolomé de las Casas, and another by Gonzalo Fernández de Oviedo. The itineraries described in these sources, however, do not perfectly concur, resulting in discrepancies within historical literature. For instance, historian Miles H. Davidson describes the Ferdinand and de las Casas accounts as both the most influential ones generally, and also so inaccurate or distorted as to make ascertaining fact from fiction "the most difficult task for the Columbus" scholar today. They further note that primary and secondary sources on this voyage disagree on "most of the dates" they provide, citing as an example the date of departure from Cádiz, which is "reported differently by all participants".

=== In culture ===
The 1492 Capitulaciones de Santa Fe had secured for Columbus and his heirs a number of privileges concerning lands discovered and formally possessed by him. As the admiral discovered and formally possessed continental lands during his fourth voyage, rather than merely insular ones, a dispute soon arose regarding the extent of mainland to which the Santa Fe privileges applied. In 1508, this resulted in the protracted Pleitos Colombinos, wherein Columbus's son and heir Diego sued the Spanish crown for recognition of his inherited Santa Fe privileges, alleging they appertained to large tracts of mainland Middle America by dint of their discovery and possession by his father during his fourth voyage.

== Itinerary ==
The following is an abbreviated timeline of the fourth voyage of Columbus, as detailed above.

- 26 February 1502: Columbus petitions the Spanish crown for a carta de privilegio (Note: 'Real cedula by the Spanish crown conferring a privilege'.) o capitulación to embark on a fourth voyage to the New World.
- 4 March 1502: In Seville, Columbus commissions vessels for his fleet.
- 14 March 1502: In Valencia de la Torre, Columbus's petition is granted when cartas de privilegio o capitulaciones are issued.
- 3 April 1502: The fleet depart from Seville.
- 6 May 1502–11 May 1502: The fleet depart from Cádiz.
- 20 May 1502: The fleet arrive in Gran Canaria.
- 25 May 1502–26 May 1502: The fleet depart from El Hierro.
- 15 June 1502–16 June 1502: The fleet arrive in Martinique.
- 29 June 1502: The fleet arrive in Hispaniola.
- 30 June 1502: In Hispaniola, the fleet weather a hurricane.
- 3 July 1502: The fleet arrive at Ocoa Bay, just off Río Ocoa.
- 14 July 1502–15 July 1502: The fleet depart from Ocoa Bay.
- 30 July 1502: The fleet arrive in Guanaxa.
- 14 August 1502–17 August 1502: The fleet arrive at Río Romano.
- 14 September 1502: The fleet round Cabo Gracias a Dios.
- 16 September 1502: The fleet arrive at Río Grande.
- 25 September 1502: The fleet arrive at Puerto Limón.
- 5 October 1502: The fleet arrive at Almirante Bay, within the Bocas del Toro islands.
- 6 October 1502: The fleet arrive at Chiriquí Lagoon.
- 16 October 1502–17 October 1502: The fleet depart from Chiriquí Lagoon.
- 2 November 1502: The fleet arrive at Porto Bello.
- 10 November 1502: The fleet arrive at Nombre de Dios Bay, just off Nombre de Dios.
- 23 November 1502: The fleet depart from Nombre de Dios Bay.
- 17 December 1502: The fleet arrive at Bahía Limón.
- 25 December 1502–26 December 1502: The fleet arrive (again) at Bahía Limón.
- 3 January 1503: The fleet depart from Bahía Limón.
- 6 January 1503: The fleet arrive at Río Belén.
- 6 February 1503: In Río Belén, Columbus despatches a party to explore area.
- 16 April 1503: The fleet depart from Río Belén.
- 1 May 1503: The fleet depart from some unidentified point on the mainland, possibly Punta Mosquito.
- 12 May 1503: The fleet arrive at Jardines de la Reina.
- 20 May 1503: The fleet depart from Jardines de la Reina.
- 23 June 1503: The fleet arrive at Saint Ann's Bay, just off the eponymous town, and are marooned.
- 2 January 1504: In Saint Ann's, some of the crew start a mutiny.
- 29 February 1504: In Saint Ann's, Columbus and some local caciques observe a lunar eclipse.
- 19 May 1504–20 May 1504: In Saint Ann's, the crew's mutiny is suppressed or ends.
- 28 June 1504–29 June 1504: The fleet depart from Saint Ann's.
- 3 August 1504–13 August 1504: The fleet arrive at Nueva Isabela.
- 12 September 1504: The fleet depart from Nueva Isabela.
- 7 November 1504: The fleet arrive at Sanlúcar de Barrameda.

The following table lists itineraries for the fourth voyage of Columbus, as described in five first and second-hand accounts of the trip. From left to right, the accounts covered below are those of the Porras brothers, Christopher Columbus, Ferdinand Columbus, de Ledesma, and de las Casas.

Itineraries as per select accounts the fourth voyage of Columbus.
Porras (Note: Route according to Francisco and Diego de Porras.)	Admiral (Note: Route according to Christopher Columbus.)	Ferdinand (Note: Route according to Ferdinand Columbus.)	Ledesma (Note: Route according to Pedro de Ledesma.)	Casas (Note: Route according to Bartolomé de las Casas.)
Martininó	Dominica	Martininó	—	—
—	—	Dominica	—	—
—	—	Santa Cruz	—	—
—	—	San Juan	—	—
La Española	La Española	La Española	—	La Española
Jamaica	Jamaica	Los Pozos (Note: For Ferdinand, these were islands near Jamaica.)	—	Isletas
Jardín de la Reina	Las Figueras	—	—	Jardín de la Reina
Guanajas (Note: Identified in. For the Porras, Guanaxa was smaller than nearby Bay Islands. For Ferdinand, it was larger than them.)	—	Guanaja	Guanasa	Isla Guanaja o Isla de Pinos
—	—	—	—	Cyguare
Punta Caxinas (Note: Identified in as Cape Honduras, Cabo de Honduras or Cabo Honduras. See Cabo Honduras. For the Porras, this peninsula was 70 leagues from Gracias a Dios.)	—	Punta Cajinas	—	Punta Caxinas
Río Posysyón (Note: Identified in as Río Romano or de la Posesión in western Honduras.)	—	Golfo de Honduras	Uiuya	—
Gracias a Dios	Gracias a Dios	Gracias a Dios	Gracias a Dios	Gracias a Dios
—	—	Provincia de Veragua	—	—
—	—	Nombre de Dios	—	—
Río del Desastre	—	Río de la Desgracia	—	Río del Desastre
Cabo de Toas (Note: For the Porras, this cape was 12 leagues from Río del Desastre.)	—	—	—	—
Provincia del Cariay	Cariay	Isla Quiribirí o Cariay	Provincia de Cariay	Isla Quiribirí o Cariari o Huerta
Cerabaró	Çarabaru	Canal Cerabaró	Provincia de Carábaru	Carabaró
Aburemá	—	Canal Aburemá	—	Aburemá
Río Guiga	—	Río Guiga	—	—
Ysla del Escudo (Note: For the Porras, this island was 15 leagues from Aburemá.)	—	—	—	—
—	—	Río Cateba	Provincia de Catiba	Río Catiba
—	—	Cobraba	—	—
—	—	Veragua o Hurirá	Provincia de Urirá	Veragua o Hurirá
—	—	Cubija	—	Cubija
Punta de Prados (Note: For the Porras, this peninsula was 28 leagues from Ysla de Escudo, and 35 leagues from Puerto de Bastimentos.)	—	—	—	—
Provincia de Cobraba	—	—	—	—
—	Belpuerto (Note: Identified in.)	Portobelo	—	Puerto Belo
—	—	Islas Nombre de Dios	—	Puerto Nombre de Dios
Puerto de Bastimentos (Note: Possibly Bastimentos.)	Puerto de Bastimentos	Puerto de Bastimentos	—	Puerto de Bastimentos
—	—	—	—	Tierra Guiga
Puerto Retrete	Puerto Retrete	Puerto Retrete	—	Puerto Retrete
—	—	Portobelo	—	—
—	—	Canal Huiva	—	—
N Ebra	—	Río Yebra	—	Río Yebra
—	Puerto Gordo (Note: Identified in. For the admiral, this entry logs a return arrival to Puerto Gordo, but no first arrival is logged.)	—	—	—
Río Beragua	Beragua o Huerta	Río Beragua o Hurirá	Río Veragua	Río Veragua
—	Puerto	Cobraba	—	—
—	—	Zobraba	—	—
—	—	Río Cateba	—	—
—	Beragua	—	—	—
Santa María de Belén	Belén	Río Belén	—	—
—	Belporto	Portobelo	—	Belporto
—	—	Puerto Retrete	Puerto Retrete	—
—	—	Islas Barbas	Islas Barvas	Islas Barbas
—	—	Punta Mármol	—	Punta Cartagena
—	—	Islas Tortugas	—	Islas Tortugas
Juana	Mango	Jardín de la Reina	Ysla de Cuba	Jardín de la Reina
Jamaica	Jamaica	Jamaica	—	Jamaica

== Ships ==
The following table lists the four vessels which composed the fleet for the fourth voyage of Columbus.

Fleet of the fourth voyage of Columbus.
	Capitana	Santiago	Gallego	Vizcaíno
Variant names (Note: Exluding those formed by dropping a definite article, as in Vizcaína from La Vizcaína.)	La Capitana; La Gracia de Dios; La Santa María	El Santiago; El Santiago de Palos; La Bermuda	El Gallego; La Gallega	El Vizcaíno; La Vizcaína
Type	caravel		navío (Note: Either any type of vessel, or else a large ship, warship, or ship of the line.)	
Owner	Mateo Sánchez	—	Alonso Cerrajero	Juan de Orquiva
Commissioned	4 March 1502			
Decommissioned	12 August 1503	23 July 1503	15 April 1503	23 April 1503
Crew	50	37	27	25
Admiral	Christopher Columbus			
Captain	Diego Tristán	Francisco de Porras	Pedro de Terreros	Bartolomé de Fiesco
Pilot	Juan Sánchez (Note: Also pilot major of the fleet.)	—		
Maestre	Ambrosio Sánchez	Francisco Bermúdez	Quintero de Algruta	—
Contramaestre	Antón Donato	Pedro Gómez	Alonso Remón	Martín de Fuenterrabia
Other company (Note: Noted at the time or in later literature.)	Anton Alaminas			
Other company	Ferdinand Columbus	Bartholomew Columbus; Andrea Columbus (Note: Admiral's nephew.); Diego de Porras (Note: Noted in.); Diego Méndez (Note: Noted in. See Diego Méndez de Segura.)	—	Pedro de Ledesma (Note: Noted in.)

== See also ==
- Cabot expeditions – to mainland Northern America in the 1490s
- Bastidas expedition – to southern Middle America in the earlier 1500s
- Pinzón–Solís expedition – partly retraced this voyage in the later 1500s
- Magellan expedition – discovered a western route to the Far East by 1522

== Notes and references ==
=== References ===
1. Bedini SA, ed. (2000) [first published 1992 by Simon & Schuster]. The Christopher Columbus Encyclopedia (reprint of 1st ed.). Basingstoke, England: Macmillian. doi:10.1007/978-1-349-12573-9. ISBN 978-1-349-12573-9.
2. Carter R (November 2006). "Yucatan Channel and Trade". FAMSI Journal of the Ancient Americas. sn: 1–7. OCLC 613035173.
3. Cerezo Martínez R (2007–2008). "El plan, los viajes y los números de Cristóbal Colón". Cuadernos de Estudios Borjanos. L–LI: 441–481. ISSN 0210-8224.
4. Conti S (2011). "El cuarto viaje de Colon y las primeras posesiones españolas en Tierra Firme según algunos mapas del siglo XVI". Revista de estudios colombinos. 7: 35–48. ISSN 1699-3926.
5. Davidson MH (1997). Columbus Then and Now: A Life Reexamined. Norman, Oklahoma; London: University of Oklahoma Press. ISBN 0-8061-2934-4. OL 3353000W.
6. de Altolaguirre y Duvale A, Bonilla y San Martín A, eds. (1892). De los pleitos de Colón. Colección de documentos inéditos relativos al descubrimiento, conquista y organización de las antiguas posesiones españolas de ultramar : Segunda serie : Colección de documentos inéditos de ultramar. Vol. 7. Madrid: Real Academia de la Historia.
7. Fernández-Armesto F (1991) [first published 1991 by Oxford University Press]. Columbus (reprint of 1st ed.). Oxford; New York: Oxford University Press. ISBN 0-19-215898-8.
8. García Cruzado E, ed. (2011). Jornadas IV, V y VI, 2008, 2009 y 2010. Actas de las jornadas de historia sobre el descubrimiento de América. Vol. II. Palos de la Frontera, Spain: Universidad Internacional de Andalucía; Ayuntamiento de Palos de la Frontera. doi:10.56451/10334/3367. hdl:10334/3367. ISBN 978-84-7993-211-4.
9. Gil J (2003). "Las cuentas del cuarto viaje de Cristóbal Colón" (PDF). Anuario de Estudios Americanos. 60 (2): 611–634. doi:10.3989/aeamer.2003.v60.i2.160.
10. Gómez PR (2006). "Çoçumba, los mayas, los españoles y la comercialización del cacao (1502–1600)". Yaxkin. XXII: 5–41. ISSN 0254-7627.
11. Goodwin WA (July 2011). Archaeology and Indigeneity, Past and Present: A View from the Island of Roatán, Honduras (MA thesis). Tampa, Florida: University of South Florida.
12. Healy PF, Savage D (March 2021). "The T-shaped "axe" from Northeast Honduras: Observations on chronology and function of a pre Columbian stone tool". Journal of Lithic Studies. 8 (1): 1–22. doi:10.2218/jls.5771. S2CID 245319193.
13. Hofman C, Keehnen F (2019). Hofman CL, Keehnen FW (eds.). Material Encounters and Indigenous Transformations in the Early Colonial Americas: Archaeological Case Studies. The Early Americas: History and Culture. Vol. 9. Leiden; Boston: Brill. doi:10.1163/9789004273689. ISBN 978-90-04-27368-9.
14. Ikäheimo J, Salmi AK, Äikäs T, eds. (2015). Sounds Like Theory: XII Nordic Theoretical Archaeology Group Meeting in Oulu 25–28 April 2012. Monographs of the Archaeological Society of Finland. Vol. 2. Helsinki: Archaeological Society of Finland. ISBN 978-952-67594-7-0.
15. Keen B, ed. (1959). The Life of the Admiral Christopher Columbus by his Son Ferdinand. New Brunswick, New Jersey: Rutgers University Press.
16. León Guerrero MM (2005). "Los pasajeros del cuarto viaje de Colón". Revista de estudios colombinos. 1: 19–32. ISSN 1699-3926.
17. León Guerrero MM (2006). "Cronistas de los viajes colombinos". Revista de humanidades: Tecnológico de Monterrey. 20: 112–129. ISSN 1405-4167.
18. Major RH, ed. (1870) [first published 1847 by the Hakluyt Society]. Select letters of Christopher Columbus, with other Original Documents relating to this Four Voyages to the New World. First series. Vol. 43 (2nd ed.). London: Hakluyt Society. OL 6916430M.
19. Polo Martín B (June 2015). "La controversia sobre la cartografía del cuarto viaje colombino durante la regencia de Fernando el Católico: la ruta real". Revista de estudios colombino. 11: 143–156. ISSN 1699-3926.
20. Reichert R (January–June 2017). "El golfo de Honduras: estrategias geopolíticas y militares de una frontera imperial, siglos XVI-XVIII". Tzintzun. 65: 9–40. ISSN 2007-963X.
21. Rivera Dorado M, Ciudad Ruiz A, eds. (1986). Los mayas de los tiempos tardíos. Publicaciones de la Sociedad Española de Estudios Mayas. Vol. 1. Madrid: Sociedad Española de Estudios Mayas; Instituto de Cooperación Iberoamericana. ISBN 84-398-7120-1.
22. Sheptak RN (June 2013). Colonial Masca in motion: tactics of persistence of a Honduran indigenous community (PhD thesis). Leiden, Netherlands: Leiden University. hdl:1887/20999.
23. Strong WD (1935). "Archeological Investigations in the Bay Islands, Spanish Honduras". Smithsonian Miscellaneous Collections. 92 (14): 1–176. hdl:10088/23868. ISSN 0096-8749.
24. Varela C (1985). "El rol del cuarto viaje colombino". Anuario de Estudios Americanos. 42: 243–295. hdl:10261/28364. ISSN 0210-5810.
