= Domenico Colombo =

Father of Christopher Columbus (1418–1496)

- Born: 1 March 1418
- Died: 1496 (aged 77–78)
- Other names: English: Dominic Columbus; Genoese: Domenego Corombo
- Occupations: Weaver, wool merchant, cheesemaker, tavern keeper
- Spouse: Susanna Fontanarossa (m. 1445; died 1489)
- Children: 5, including Christopher and Bartholomew
- Parents: Giovanni Colombo (father); Angela Fontana (mother)
- Relatives: Diego Columbus (grandson); Ferdinand Columbus (grandson)

Domenico Colombo (English: Dominic Columbus; Genoese: Domenego Corombo; 1 March 1418 – 1496) was a Genoese weaver, wool merchant, cheesemaker, and tavern keeper. He was the father of Christopher Columbus and Bartholomew Columbus.

== Biography ==
Domenico was born in 1418, the son of Giovanni Colombo and Angela Fontana. He had three brothers: Franceschino, Giacomo, and Bertino.

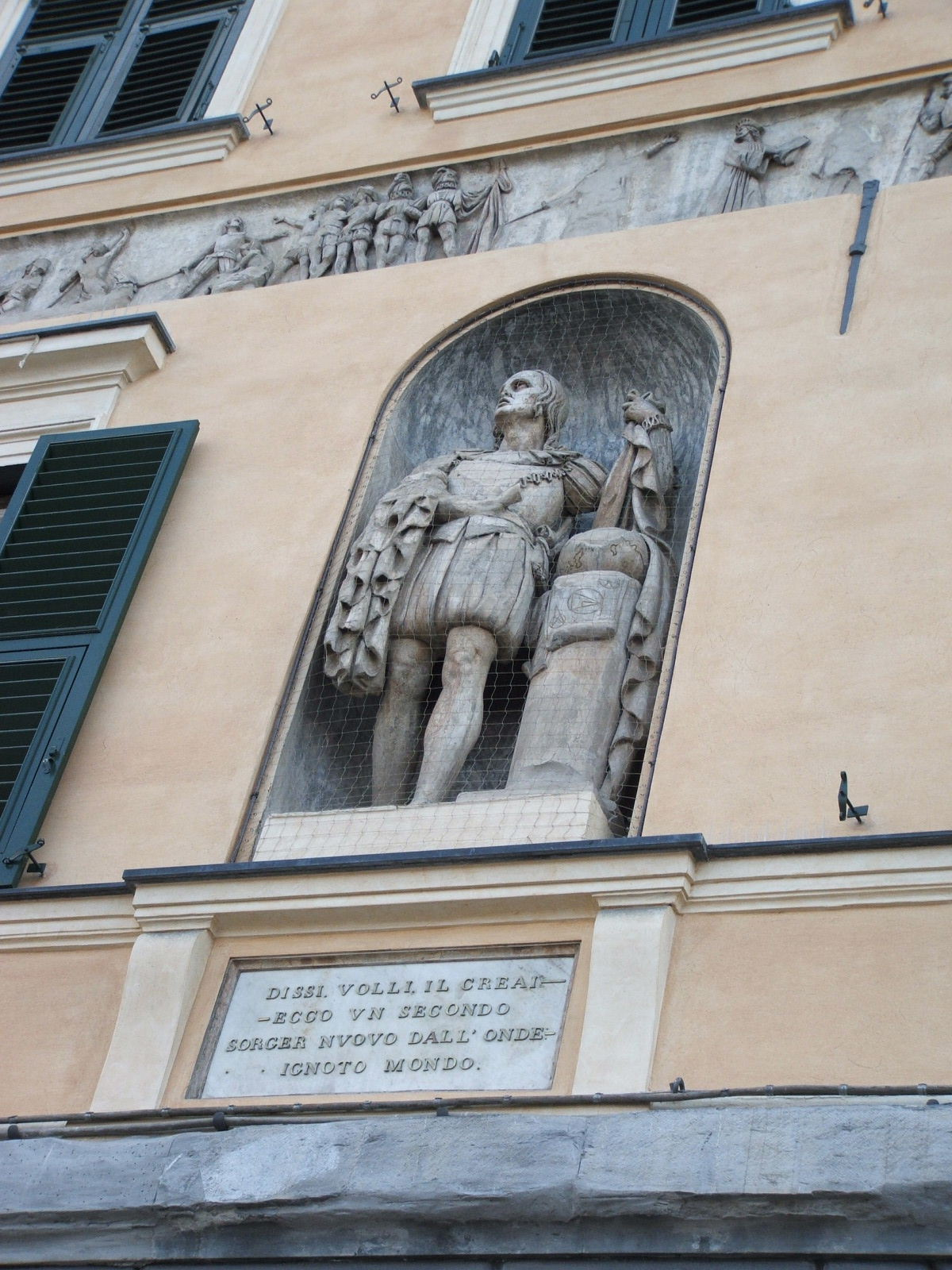
Statue of Christopher Columbus, son of Domenico Colombo

His father apprenticed him to the loom at age 11. Domenico, a third-generation master of his craft in Genoa, Republic of Genoa, was also a shopkeeper. His position was thus secure and respectable within the lower middle class, although he would experience financial difficulties during his lifetime.

In addition to weaving, Domenico worked as a cheesemaker, tavern keeper, and dealer in wool and wine. He married Susanna Fontanarossa.

Domenico and Susanna had five children: Cristoforo (Christopher), born in 1451; Giovanni Pellegrino; Bartolomeo; Giacomo (also called Diego); and Bianchinetta.

After monetary difficulties, Domenico received financial assistance from his Christopher. Two of his sons, Bartholomew and Christopher, later pursued careers at sea rather than continuing the family weaving business.

Domenico's daughter-in-law was Filipa Moniz Perestrelo. His grandchildren included Diego Columbus and Ferdinand Columbus. He also had one natural granddaughter, Maria.
