= March 1504 lunar eclipse =

Total lunar eclipse of March 1504

- Total eclipse
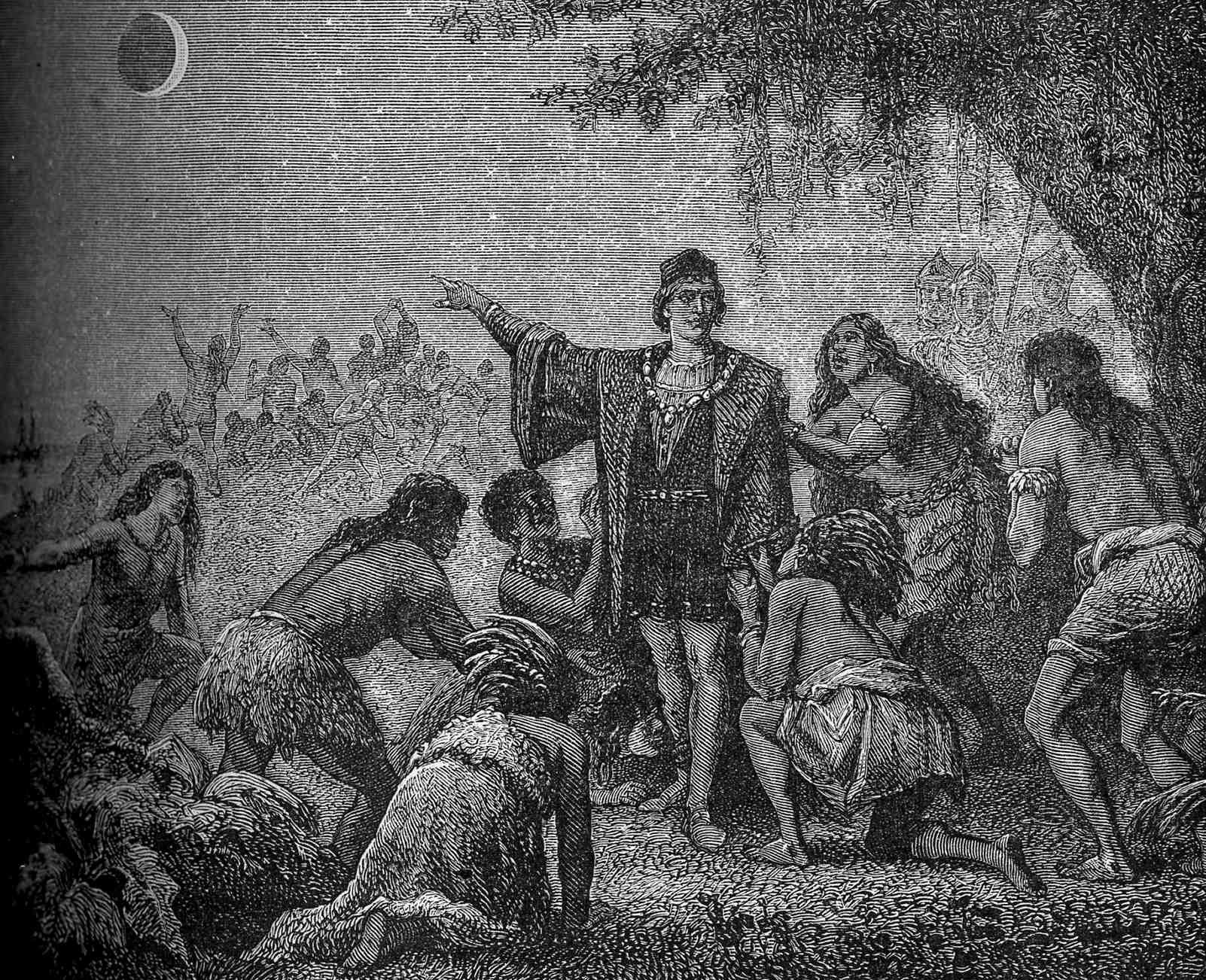
- Woodcut of Columbus' prediction of the lunar eclipse to the native Jamaicans, taken from Camille Flammarion, Astronomie populaire: Description générale du ciel (Paris, 1880), p. 231.
- Date: 1 March 1504
- Gamma: 0.4057
- Magnitude: 1.0956
- Saros cycle: 105 (53 of 74)
- Totality: 47 minutes, 36 seconds
- Partiality: 205 minutes, 45 seconds
- Penumbral: 339 minutes, 40 seconds
Contacts (UTC)
- P1: 21:51:47 (29 February)
- U1: 22:58:41 (29 February)
- U2: 00:17:46
- Greatest: 00:41:35
- U3: 01:05:22
- U4: 02:24:26
- P4: 03:31:27

A total lunar eclipse occurred on 1 March 1504, visible at sunset for the Americas, and later over night over Europe and Africa, and near sunrise over Asia.

During his fourth and last voyage, Christopher Columbus induced the inhabitants of Jamaica to continue provisioning him and his hungry men, successfully intimidating them by correctly predicting a total lunar eclipse for 1 March 1504 (visible on the evening of 29 February in the Americas). Some have claimed that Columbus used the Ephemeris of the German astronomer Regiomontanus, but Columbus himself attributed the prediction to the Almanach by Abraham Zacuto.

== Visibility ==
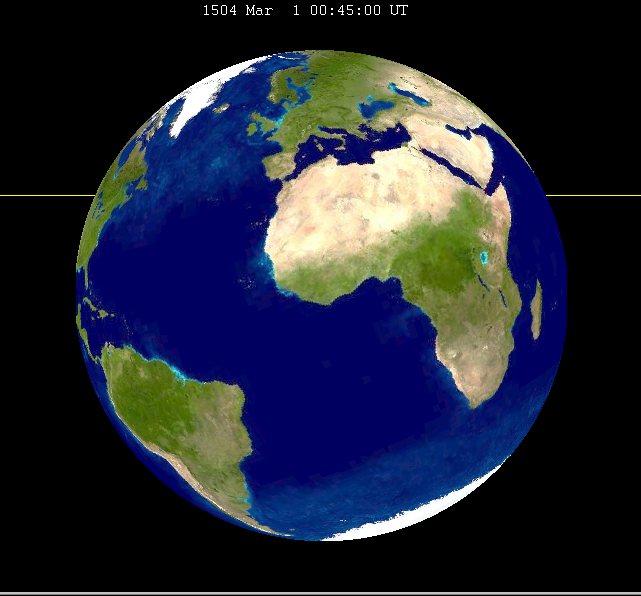
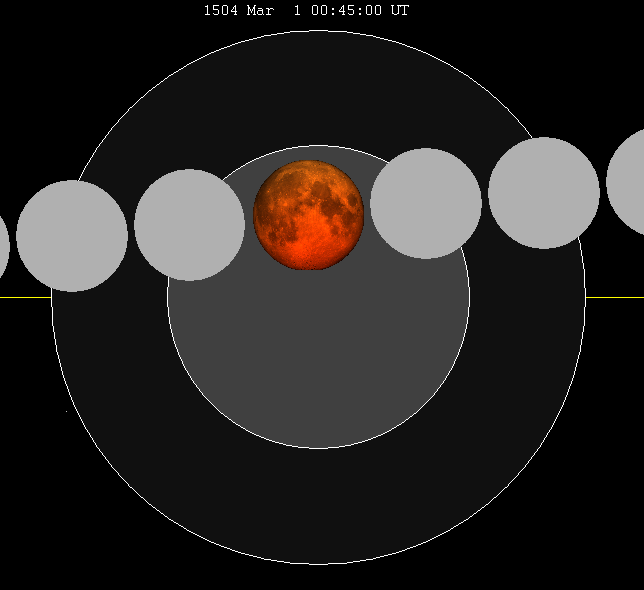
The eclipse was visible after sunset on 29 February from most of North America, all of South America, as well as across Europe, Africa, and western Asia on the morning of 1 March.

== Observations ==
On 30 June 1503, Christopher Columbus beached his two last caravels and was stranded in Jamaica. The indigenous people of the island welcomed Columbus and his crew and fed them, but after six months, they halted the food supply, dissatisfied with what the Spaniards could provide in trade. Columbus had on board an almanac authored by Abraham Zacuto of astronomical tables covering the years 1475–1506. Upon consulting the book, he noticed the date and the time of an upcoming lunar eclipse. He was able to use this information to his advantage. He requested a meeting for that day with the cacique, the leader, and told him that God was angry with the local people's treatment of Columbus and his men. Columbus said God would provide a clear sign of displeasure by making the rising full Moon appear "inflamed with wrath".

The lunar eclipse and the red Moon appeared on schedule, and the indigenous people were impressed and frightened. The son of Columbus, Ferdinand, wrote that the people:

with great howling and lamentation they came running from every direction to the ships, laden with provisions, praying the Admiral to intercede by all means with God on their behalf; that he might not visit his wrath upon them ...

Columbus went into his cabin, ostensibly to pray, and timed the eclipse with his hourglass. Shortly before the totality ended after 48 minutes, he told the frightened indigenous people that they were going to be forgiven. When the Moon started to reappear from the shadow of the Earth, he told them that God had pardoned them.

=== Longitude ===
Columbus was perhaps the first to put into practice an idea proposed by Hipparchus, to use a lunar eclipse to determine one's geographical longitude. A lunar eclipse is visible across half the globe, and everyone sees it begin and end at the same moment. But the times when measured in the local solar time will differ, because everyone is in a different time zone. The local time is determined by observing the rise, culmination, or setting of the Sun. Now an almanac will predict an eclipse for some place at a certain geographical longitude at a specific local time there. The same event observed elsewhere will occur at a different clocktime. The difference in time is proportional to the difference in geographical longitude, by 15 degrees per hour.

Columbus had no accurate means to determine how far he had travelled west on the globe. He observed the lunar eclipses of 15 September 1494 near Hispaniola (Dominican Republic), and that of 29 February 1504 from Jamaica. In the latter case he reported in his journal that Jamaica was 7 hours and 15 minutes from Cádiz in Spain – well on his way to China. However his site at Jamaica is actually at a longitude 4 hours 44 minutes from Cádiz. How Columbus could make such a large error of 2 1/2 hours remains puzzling, but D.W. Olson proposed a reconstruction.

Columbus presumably used the Calendarium from Regiomontanus. This almanac gives the time of mid-eclipse at Nuremberg, but if Columbus erroneously interpreted the listed time as that of the beginning of the partial eclipse, then his 2 1/2h error could be explained. One can imagine that such false evidence confirmed Columbus in his belief he had reached China, overlooking the fact that he had reached a continent previously unknown to Europeans.

=== Fictional variations ===
H. Rider Haggard used an altered version of the real story of the rescue of Columbus in his novel King Solomon's Mines (first published 1885), where hero Allan Quatermain and his companions recruit supporters for their cause from the local tribe by predicting a lunar eclipse. (In early editions, this was a solar eclipse; Haggard changed it after realising that his description of a solar eclipse was not realistic.)

In Mark Twain's 1889 novel, A Connecticut Yankee in King Arthur's Court, the protagonist, Hank Morgan, a time-travelling 19th-century resident of Hartford, Connecticut, escapes being burned at the stake by predicting a solar eclipse in early medieval England during the time of the legendary King Arthur. Bolesław Prus' historical novel, Pharaoh, written in 1894–1895, also uses this trope.

A similar plot also features in The Adventures of Tintin comic, Prisoners of the Sun, first published between 1946 and 1948.

The Guatemalan writer Augusto Monterroso used a similar plot in his very short story, El eclipse, published in 1959 in Obras completas (y otros cuentos), but with an opposite ending, sarcastic and anticolonialist.

== See also ==
- List of 16th-century lunar eclipses
- Historically significant lunar eclipses
