= Lunar Saros 105 =

Series of lunar eclipses

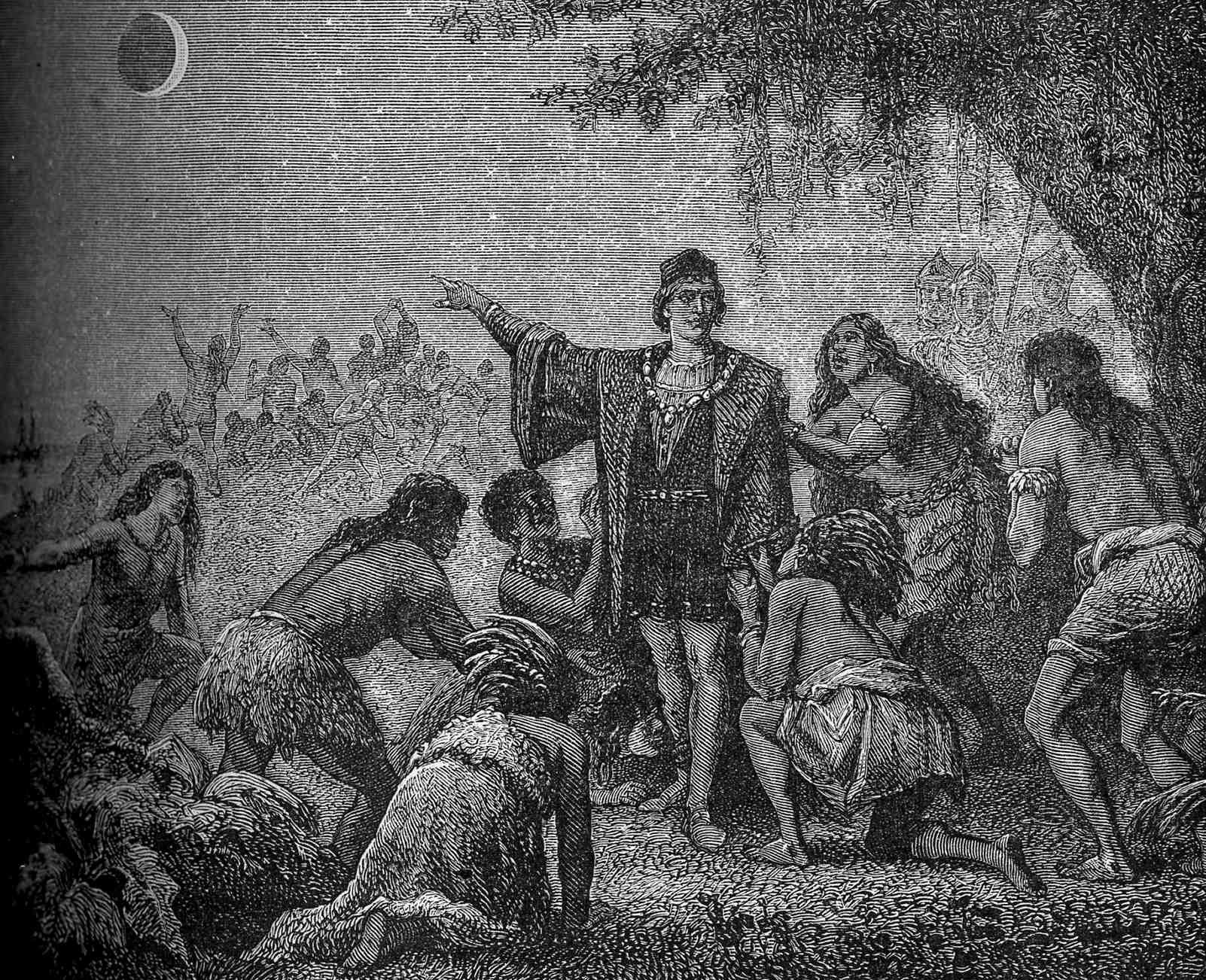
Christopher Columbus observed the 1504 March 1 total lunar eclipse while stranded in Jamaica. Series member 53

Saros cycle series 105 for lunar eclipses occurred at the moon's descending node, repeating every 18 years 11 and 1/3 days. It contained 73 events between 566 August 16 and 1864 October 15. Some sources report a 74th eclipse occurring on 1882 October 26.

This lunar saros was linked to Solar Saros 112.

== List ==
Cat.	Saros	Mem	Date	Time UT (hr:mn)	Type	Gamma	Magnitude	Duration (min)			Contacts UT (hr:mn)						Chart
Cat.	Saros	Mem	Date	Greatest	Type	Gamma	Magnitude	Pen.	Par.	Tot.	P1	P4	U1	U2	U3	U4	Chart
06179	105	1	566 Aug 16	19:12:38	Penumbral	-1.5296	-0.9678	78.6			18:33:20	19:51:56					
06225	105	2	584 Aug 27	2:28:31	Penumbral	-1.4809	-0.8815	119.0			1:29:01	3:28:01					
06272	105	3	602 Sep 07	9:51:15	Penumbral	-1.4381	-0.8062	145.3			8:38:36	11:03:54					
06319	105	4	620 Sep 17	17:20:56	Penumbral	-1.4012	-0.7417	164.6			15:58:38	18:43:14					
06365	105	5	638 Sep 29	0:58:43	Penumbral	-1.3712	-0.6897	178.9			23:29:16	2:28:10					
06410	105	6	656 Oct 09	8:43:47	Penumbral	-1.3473	-0.6486	189.7			7:08:56	10:18:38					
06455	105	7	674 Oct 20	16:36:37	Penumbral	-1.3301	-0.6198	197.4			14:57:55	18:15:19					
06501	105	8	692 Oct 31	0:33:45	Penumbral	-1.3168	-0.5979	203.3			22:52:06	2:15:24					
06545	105	9	710 Nov 11	8:37:48	Penumbral	-1.3094	-0.5863	207.0			6:54:18	10:21:18					
06589	105	10	728 Nov 21	16:44:17	Penumbral	-1.3041	-0.5784	209.8			14:59:23	18:29:11					
06633	105	11	746 Dec 03	0:53:43	Penumbral	-1.3017	-0.5753	211.4			23:08:01	2:39:25					
06677	105	12	764 Dec 13	9:01:39	Penumbral	-1.2984	-0.5704	213.2			7:15:03	10:48:15					
06720	105	13	782 Dec 24	17:09:39	Penumbral	-1.2956	-0.5658	214.7			15:22:18	18:57:00					
06762	105	14	801 Jan 04	1:13:24	Penumbral	-1.2895	-0.5550	217.2			23:24:48	3:02:00					
06803	105	15	819 Jan 15	9:12:36	Penumbral	-1.2802	-0.5377	220.6			7:22:18	11:02:54					
06844	105	16	837 Jan 25	17:04:56	Penumbral	-1.2655	-0.5103	225.5			15:12:11	18:57:41					
06884	105	17	855 Feb 06	0:50:13	Penumbral	-1.2454	-0.4728	231.8			22:54:19	2:46:07					
06925	105	18	873 Feb 16	8:26:20	Penumbral	-1.2181	-0.4218	239.9			6:26:23	10:26:17					
06967	105	19	891 Feb 27	15:53:21	Penumbral	-1.1834	-0.3572	249.4			13:48:39	17:58:03					
07009	105	20	909 Mar 09	23:10:48	Penumbral	-1.1411	-0.2782	260.3			21:00:39	1:20:57					
07049	105	21	927 Mar 21	6:19:21	Penumbral	-1.0915	-0.1860	271.9			4:03:24	8:35:18					
07090	105	22	945 Mar 31	13:17:13	Penumbral	-1.0333	-0.0779	284.3			10:55:04	15:39:22					
07131	105	23	963 Apr 11	20:07:31	Partial	-0.9689	0.0416	296.7	50.2		17:39:10	22:35:52	19:42:25			20:32:37	
07172	105	24	981 Apr 22	2:48:48	Partial	-0.8971	0.1745	309.0	100.9		0:14:18	5:23:18	1:58:21			3:39:15	
07214	105	25	999 May 3	9:24:58	Partial	-0.8206	0.3159	320.6	132.9		6:44:40	12:05:16	8:18:31			10:31:25	
07258	105	26	1017 May 13	15:53:23	Partial	-0.7377	0.4689	331.5	158.2		13:07:38	18:39:08	14:34:17			17:12:29	
07302	105	27	1035 May 24	22:19:50	Partial	-0.6530	0.6251	341.1	178.0		19:29:17	1:10:23	20:50:50			23:48:50	
07347	105	28	1053 Jun 04	4:42:18	Partial	-0.5650	0.7872	349.5	194.3		1:47:33	7:37:03	3:05:09			6:19:27	
07391	105	29	1071 Jun 15	11:05:23	Partial	-0.4770	0.9491	356.5	207.1		8:07:08	14:03:38	9:21:50			12:48:56	
07436	105	30	1089 Jun 25	17:27:45	Total	-0.3880	1.1127	362.2	217.1	53.8	14:26:39	20:28:51	15:39:12	17:00:51	17:54:39	19:16:18	
07483	105	31	1107 Jul 6	23:54:10	Total	-0.3018	1.271	366.4	224.5	78.9	20:50:58	2:57:22	22:01:55	23:14:43	0:33:37	1:46:25	
07529	105	32	1125 Jul 17	6:23:50	Total	-0.218	1.4247	369.3	229.5	93	3:19:11	9:28:29	4:29:05	5:37:20	7:10:20	8:18:35	
07575	105	33	1143 Jul 28	12:59:07	Total	-0.1382	1.5707	370.9	232.6	101	9:53:40	16:04:34	11:02:49	12:08:37	13:49:37	14:55:25	
07622	105	34	1161 Aug 7	19:41:17	Total	-0.0637	1.7071	371.6	234.1	104.9	16:35:29	22:47:05	17:44:14	18:48:50	20:33:44	21:38:20	
07669	105	35	1179 Aug 19	2:31:51	Total	0.0045	1.8151	371.4	234.1	105.7	23:26:09	5:37:33	0:34:48	1:39:00	3:24:42	4:28:54	
07715	105	36	1197 Aug 29	9:31:59	Total	0.0655	1.7026	370.6	233.1	104.3	6:26:41	12:37:17	7:35:26	8:39:50	10:24:08	11:28:32	
07761	105	37	1215 Sep 09	16:40:52	Total	0.1199	1.6022	369.2	231.5	101.4	13:36:16	19:45:28	14:45:07	15:50:10	17:31:34	18:36:37	
07807	105	38	1233 Sep 20	0:00:52	Total	0.1657	1.5176	367.7	229.4	97.5	20:57:01	3:04:43	22:06:10	23:12:07	0:49:37	1:55:34	
07852	105	39	1251 Oct 01	7:29:58	Total	0.2045	1.4459	365.9	227.2	93.1	4:27:01	10:32:55	5:36:22	6:43:25	8:16:31	9:23:34	
07896	105	40	1269 Oct 11	15:09:34	Total	0.2354	1.3888	364.2	225.0	88.8	12:07:28	18:11:40	13:17:04	14:25:10	15:53:58	17:02:04	
07941	105	41	1287 Oct 22	22:57:41	Total	0.2599	1.3436	362.5	223.0	84.8	19:56:26	1:58:56	21:06:11	22:15:17	23:40:05	0:49:11	
07987	105	42	1305 Nov 02	6:55:19	Total	0.2773	1.3116	361.0	221.3	81.5	3:54:49	9:55:49	5:04:40	6:14:34	7:36:04	8:45:58	
08030	105	43	1323 Nov 13	14:59:35	Total	0.2897	1.2890	359.6	220.0	79.0	11:59:47	17:59:23	13:09:35	14:20:05	15:39:05	16:49:35	
08072	105	44	1341 Nov 23	23:09:48	Total	0.2980	1.2744	358.2	218.9	77.2	20:10:42	2:08:54	21:20:21	22:31:12	23:48:24	0:59:15	
08114	105	45	1359 Dec 05	7:24:19	Total	0.3034	1.2653	356.9	218.0	76.0	4:25:52	10:22:46	5:35:19	6:46:19	8:02:19	9:13:19	
08155	105	46	1377 Dec 15	15:42:20	Total	0.3069	1.2601	355.5	217.3	75.2	12:44:35	18:40:05	13:53:41	15:04:44	16:19:56	17:30:59	
08196	105	47	1395 Dec 27	0:00:15	Total	0.3111	1.2539	354.1	216.5	74.4	21:03:12	2:57:18	22:12:00	23:23:03	0:37:27	1:48:30	
08237	105	48	1414 Jan 06	8:17:53	Total	0.3163	1.2463	352.5	215.7	73.3	5:21:38	11:14:08	6:30:02	7:41:14	8:54:32	10:05:44	
08279	105	49	1432 Jan 17	16:32:40	Total	0.3247	1.2331	350.6	214.6	71.5	13:37:22	19:27:58	14:45:22	15:56:55	17:08:25	18:19:58	
08320	105	50	1450 Jan 28	0:45:08	Total	0.3360	1.2148	348.5	213.2	69.0	21:50:53	3:39:23	22:58:32	0:10:38	1:19:38	2:31:44	
08361	105	51	1468 Feb 08	8:50:31	Total	0.3539	1.1847	346.0	211.3	64.5	5:57:31	11:43:31	7:04:52	8:18:16	9:22:46	10:36:10	
08401	105	52	1486 Feb 18	16:51:51	Total	0.3760	1.1471	343.1	209.0	58.2	14:00:18	19:43:24	15:07:21	16:22:45	17:20:57	18:36:21	
08441	105	53	1504 Mar 01	0:44:47	Total	0.4057	1.0956	339.7	205.8	47.6	21:54:56	3:34:38	23:01:53	0:20:59	1:08:35	2:27:41	
08482	105	54	1522 Mar 12	8:32:37	Total	0.4404	1.0350	335.8	201.8	29.3	5:44:43	11:20:31	6:51:43	8:17:58	8:47:16	10:13:31	
08523	105	55	1540 Mar 22	16:11:08	Partial	0.4838	0.9587	331.0	196.4		13:25:38	18:56:38	14:32:56			17:49:20	
08566	105	56	1558 Apr 02	23:45:10	Partial	0.5316	0.8741	325.6	189.8		21:02:22	2:27:58	22:10:16			1:20:04	
08609	105	57	1576 Apr 13	7:11:16	Partial	0.5865	0.7763	319.2	181.4		4:31:40	9:50:52	5:40:34			8:41:58	
08652	105	58	1594 May 4	14:32:42	Partial	0.6461	0.6699	311.9	171.0		11:56:45	17:08:39	13:07:12			15:58:12	
08696	105	59	1612 May 14	21:48:17	Partial	0.7111	0.5534	303.4	157.9		19:16:35	0:19:59	20:29:20			23:07:14	
08740	105	60	1630 May 26	5:01:22	Partial	0.7788	0.4318	293.7	141.7		2:34:31	7:28:13	3:50:31			6:12:13	
08784	105	61	1648 Jun 05	12:11:39	Partial	0.8497	0.3041	282.8	120.8		9:50:15	14:33:03	11:11:15			13:12:03	
08829	105	62	1666 Jun 16	19:20:41	Partial	0.9222	0.1732	270.5	92.6		17:05:26	21:35:56	18:34:23			20:06:59	
08875	105	63	1684 Jun 27	2:30:11	Partial	0.9948	0.0416	257.0	46.1		0:21:41	4:38:41	2:07:08			2:53:14	
08921	105	64	1702 Jul 09	9:41:33	Penumbral	1.0664	-0.0883	242.1			7:40:30	11:42:36					
08967	105	65	1720 Jul 19	16:55:34	Penumbral	1.1366	-0.2159	225.9			15:02:37	18:48:31					
09014	105	66	1738 Jul 31	0:13:25	Penumbral	1.2043	-0.3392	208.4			22:29:13	1:57:37					
09061	105	67	1756 Aug 10	7:36:47	Penumbral	1.2682	-0.4558	189.6			6:01:59	9:11:35					
09107	105	68	1774 Aug 21	15:06:39	Penumbral	1.3271	-0.5635	169.8			13:41:45	16:31:33					
09152	105	69	1792 Aug 31	22:42:42	Penumbral	1.3816	-0.6634	148.5			21:28:27	23:56:57					
09197	105	70	1810 Sep 13	6:27:11	Penumbral	1.4299	-0.7520	126.2			5:24:05	7:30:17					
09242	105	71	1828 Sep 23	14:19:43	Penumbral	1.4724	-0.8302	102.0			13:28:43	15:10:43					
09289	105	72	1846 Oct 04	22:21:39	Penumbral	1.5077	-0.8954	75.7			21:43:48	22:59:30					
09333	105	73	1864 Oct 15	6:30:47	Penumbral	1.5379	-0.9512	41.1			6:10:14	6:51:20					

== See also ==
- List of lunar eclipses
  - List of Saros series for lunar eclipses
