= Bartholomew Columbus =

Italian explorer (c.1461–1515)

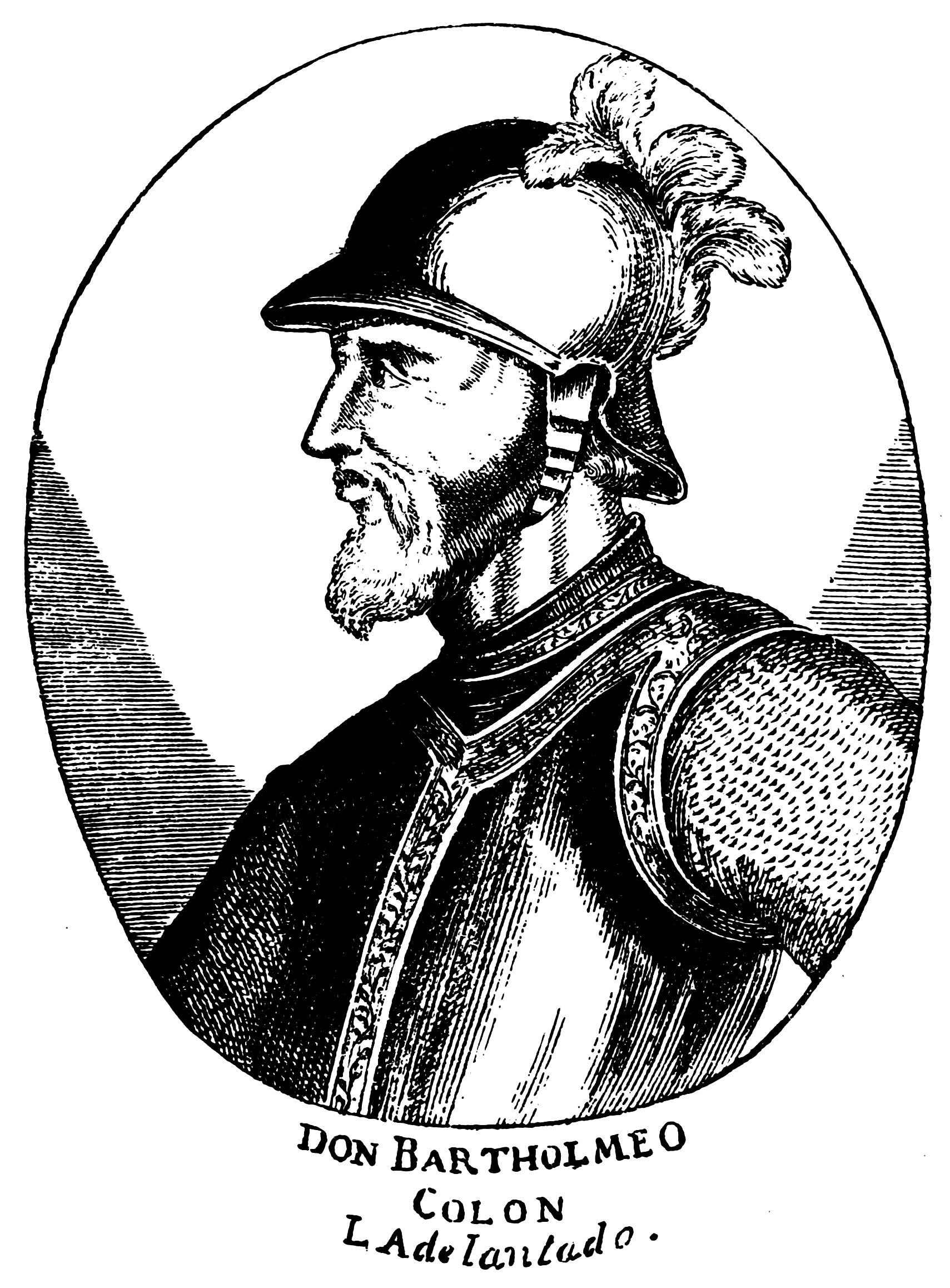
- Born: Bartholomew Columbus c. 1461; Genoa, Republic of Genoa
- Died: 12 August 1514 (aged 53–54); Santo Domingo, Crown of Castile
- Parent(s): Domenico Colombo; Susanna Fontanarossa
- Relatives: Christopher Columbus (brother)

Bust in Santo Domingo

Bartholomew Columbus (Genoese: Bertomê Corombo; Portuguese: Bartolomeu Colombo; Spanish: Bartolomé Colón; Italian: Bartolomeo Colombo; c. 1461 – 12 August 1514) was a Genoese explorer and the younger brother of Christopher Columbus.

== Biography ==
Born in Genoa in 1461, Bartholomew became a mapmaker in Lisbon, the principal centre of cartography of the time, and conceived with his brother Christopher Columbus the "Enterprise of the Indies", a planned expedition to reach the Orient and its lucrative spice trade by a western rather than an eastern route. In 1489, he went to England to seek assistance from Henry VII for the execution of the expedition. He was taken by pirates and landed in England in a destitute condition, and on presenting himself at Court was unfavourably received. He then sought help at the court of Charles VIII in France, again without success.

Meanwhile, his brother Christopher was in Castile trying to persuade Isabella I of Castile and Ferdinand II of Aragon to back the expedition. When word arrived in 1493 that his brother had succeeded, Bartholomew returned to Spain, where he missed Christopher, who had already left on the second voyage of his tour to the "New World".

Funded by the Crown, Bartholomew Columbus travelled to Hispaniola in 1494 to meet his brother, where he was appointed as an adelantado, a senior-ranking governor, during his brother's absences. He founded the city of Santo Domingo on Hispaniola between 1496 and 1498, which is now the capital of the Dominican Republic. He was imprisoned together with Christopher and another brother, Giacomo (also called Diego), by Francisco de Bobadilla and returned to Spain in December 1500.

After the Court acquitted Christopher Columbus of all of the charges, the Crown funded Christopher Columbus's fourth and last voyage to the West Indies. Bartholomew accompanied his brother on this final New World voyage and was to be left with a garrison near the Belén River. Bartholomew's men were attacked by the local Ngäbe leader, El Quibían.

In 1495, Bartholomew Columbus participated in the Battle of Vega Real, a significant conflict between Spanish forces and a group of Taíno chiefdoms at Hispaniola. He served as a commander alongside his brother, as well as the Spanish officer Alonso de Ojeda.

On 30 July 1502, Bartholomew and Christopher arrived at Guanaja, one of the Bay Islands off the coast of Honduras. Christopher sent his brother to scout the island. As Bartholomew explored, a large trading canoe approached. Bartholomew Columbus boarded the canoe and found it was a Maya trading vessel from Yucatán, carrying well-dressed Maya and a rich cargo. The Europeans looted whatever took their interest from amongst the cargo and seized the elderly captain to serve as an interpreter; the canoe was then allowed to continue on its way. This was the first recorded contact between Europeans and the Maya. It is likely that news of the piratical strangers in the Caribbean passed along the Maya trade routes – the first prophecies of bearded invaders sent by Kukulkan, the northern Maya feathered serpent god, were probably recorded around this time, and in due course passed into the books of Chilam Balam.

Following Christopher Columbus's death in Spain in 1506, Bartholomew returned to the Antilles in 1509, accompanying his nephew Diego, but Bartholomew soon returned to Spain when King Ferdinand II of Aragon confirmed his concession involving Mona Island near Puerto Rico; the King would reclaim the appealing little island from Bartholomew's heirs after Bartholomew's death on 12 August 1514 (by which time Bartholomew had returned to Hispaniola).

Bartholomew Columbus had a natural daughter named Maria, born in 1508 as the result of a relationship with Catalina Marrón. Nothing is known of them beyond a brief mention in Columbus's will dated 1511.

== Legacy ==
The island of Saint Barthélemy in the Caribbean was named in his honour by Christopher Columbus.

== Sources ==
- Taviani, Paolo Emilio (1992). "Colon, Bartolome". The Christopher Columbus Encyclopedia, Vol. 1. New York: Simon & Schuster. pp. 131–133.
- Varela Marcos, Jesus. "Bartolomé Colón". Real Academia de la Historia (in Spanish).
