= Urracá =

Ngäbe chieftain

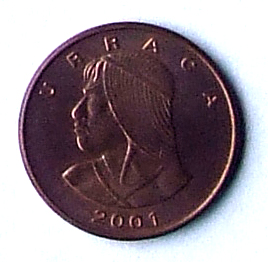
- Urracá depicted on the obverse of the Panamanian Centésimo coin.
- Died: 1531; Nata de los Caballeros
- Occupation: Cacique

Urracá or Ubarragá Maniá Tigrí (died 1531) was an Ngäbe chieftain or cacique in the region of present-day Panama who fought effectively against the Spanish conquistadors. The Spaniards captured Urracá when he met them to discuss a peace treaty, caged him, and sent him to the Caribbean port of Nombre de Dios, intending to send him to Spain. He escaped, and for "the next eleven years", with his band of men, conducted guerrilla warfare against the conquistadors, living and hiding in the hills, ultimately dying from natural causes in 1531. Urracá commenced one of the first "sustained guerrilla wars in Latin America[n]" history and is remembered as el caudillo amerindio de Veragua (the Amerindian leader of Veragua) and adversary of the Spanish Empire, the great resistance leader of Panama. He has been honored by his image on the centesimo, the smallest-denomination coin of Panama.

== History ==
Shortly after the foundation of Panama City in 1519, the Spanish Governor-Captain Pedrarias Dávila began moving into the country, hoping to find a gold-rich village. The Spanish conquered the Veragua province, which is particularly rich in gold mining. Urracá's territory was in the vicinity of the present town of Nata de los Caballeros, founded on 20 May 1520 to serve as a basis for exploration of the rest of Central America. Urracá and his forces bravely faced the Spanish expedition for almost nine years, and repeatedly defeated the conquistadors, led by Gaspar de Espinosa. When Espinosa was called back to Panama City by Pedrarias Dávila, Francisco de Compañón was commissioned to his post. Urracá attacked the Spanish warriors, but Compañón sent a messenger to report to Panama City to seek aid, and Pedrarias sent a relief battalion led by Hernán Ponce de León.

Urracá succeeded in making alliances with tribes that had been traditional enemies, in order to unite to defeat the Spaniards. Caciques such as Ponca, Dures, Duraria, Bulaba, Guisia, Guaniaga, Tabor, Guracona, Guaniagos and other great masters of Veragua united under his command. Ponce de León succeeded in breaking the siege of Nata, and he was followed by Pedrarias commanding new forces that reinforced the Spanish at Nata. Bloody clashes continued, without any of the parties achieving complete victory. In a subsequent battle, Urracá's forces managed to defeat Captain Diego de Albitres, who escaped and reported to the governor of Castilla del Oro.

=== Capture of Urracá ===
Led by Compañón, the Spanish attempted to capture Urracá with a trick. They sent emissaries to his territory to propose peace negotiations in Nata de los Caballeros. Urracá accepted the invitation and attended the site along with two of his men, but Compañón captured him, sending the chief to Nombre de Dios for transport to Spain. Urracá escaped, reunited with his people, and lived in the mountains conducting guerrilla warfare against the Spanish forces for eleven years. (Note: Historians believe that Urracá, Lord of Veraguá, may have been the same person identified as Quibian, or El Quibían by Christopher Columbus, who noted him in records of his fourth voyage to the Americas.)

== Recognition ==
Opposite the facade of Escuela Normal in the city of Santiago, capital of the province of Veraguas, stands a statue of Urracá with a warrior expression as if willing to attack the Spanish conquistadors. In his honor, the Asociación Nacional de Scouts de Panamá calls Scout Urracá the highest rank awarded to those who have made outstanding community service.

"... He was so brave and courageous, wise and skillful in war, not just to defeat the Spaniards who oppressed him ... being a man of judgment and courageous, and knowing full well how it is a war against the enemy ..." Bartolomé de las Casas, History of the Indies.

== See also ==
- Lempira (Lenca ruler)
