= El Quibían =

Indigenous king in Panama, active 1500s

El Quibían, or Quibían, was an indigenous king who ruled the lands in the river basins of Quiebra and Yebra, now called Rio Belén, on the Caribbean coast of the present day Panama, who was visited by Christopher Columbus on his fourth voyage, in early 1503.

== Title or name ==
He is mentioned in documents of Columbus' voyage with the name "El Quibían" or Quibían. As he is always identified with the prefix article, it is very possible that the word Quibían identifies a title, namely that of chief among the Ngöbe peoples. It is widely suggested by historians like Joaquin Gonzalez that this means el Quibían was, in fact, Urracá, a Ngöbe cacique who successfully united a number of tribes to defend his people in present-day Veraguas against the conquistadors, starting in 1519. Gonzalez suggests it because of the similar descriptions of the two leaders, their ability to organize neighboring tribes, and their ability to defeat the Spanish. Other historians, including Cedeño Cenci, reject the idea. The idea may seem far-fetched but their attributes were almost identical.

== Fourth voyage of Columbus during the reign of Quibían ==
The Columbian expedition reached Quibían's domains on January 6, 1503, and due to that arrival date, day of the Epiphany, Christopher Columbus gave the name of Rio Belén, meaning Bethlehem, to what the indigenous people called Yebra river. The admiral entrusted his brother, Bartholomew Columbus, to explore around the country, which resulted in an alliance with the Ngöbe under Quibían, who paid a visit to Columbus' ships.

Columbus decided to found a settlement near the mouth of the river, including several houses made of palm trees to leave provisions and people. The settlement was given the name Santa María de Belén and was to be headed by Don Bartholomew with 80 men, while Columbus returned to Spain in search of reinforcements to continue the subjugation of the area to mine its resources. However, Quibían, who was suspicious of the Columbus brothers, told them not to go past a certain point in the river. When they did, he began secretly planning with several indigenous nations to destroy the settlement and expel the foreigners.

Aware of these plans, Bartholomew Columbus captured the king, his family and friends, who he led tied up to Santa María. El Quibían tricked them into throwing him from the boat, into the river, and the Spanish assumed that since he was tied up, he would drown. The Spanish ships left the river and anchored a short distance from the coast, but while Bartholomew was on board to receive instructions from Christopher Columbus, el Quibían, who had managed to escape and gather some of the neighboring nations, attacked Santa María. There was a battle, in which Bartholomew Columbus was wounded, and el Quibían defeated the Spanish. Finally, the Spanish had to abandon their settlement and flee. On the ships, some of the relatives and friends of el Quibían tried to flee, but those who did not make it were hanged in the hold of the ship where they had been held.
