= Solar Saros 112 =

Saros cycle series 112 for solar eclipses

Historic saros cycle animation

Saros cycle series 112 for solar eclipses occurred at the Moon's descending node, repeating every 18 years, 11 days, containing 72 eclipses, 43 of which were umbral (24 total, 14 hybrid, 5 annular). The first eclipse was on 31 July 539 and the last was on 19 September 1819. The longest totality was 7 minutes 20 seconds on 9 June 1062, the longest annular eclipse was 1 minute 1 second on 23 June 1675.

This solar saros is linked to Lunar Saros 105.

== Umbral eclipses ==
Umbral eclipses (annular, total and hybrid) can be further classified as either: 1) Central (two limits), 2) Central (one limit) or 3) Non-Central (one limit). The statistical distribution of these classes in Saros series 112 appears in the following table.

Classification	Number	Percent
All Umbral eclipses	43	100.00%
Central (two limits)	43	100.00%
Central (one limit)	0	0.00%
Non-central (one limit)	0	0.00%

== All eclipses ==
Note: Dates are given in the Julian calendar prior to 15 October 1582, and in the Gregorian calendar after that.

Saros	Member	Date	Time (Greatest) UTC	Type	Location Lat, Long	Gamma	Mag.	Width (km)	Duration (min:sec)	Ref
112	1	July 31, 539	1:59:02	Partial	62.6S 123.1E	-1.4924	0.0889			
112	2	August 10, 557	9:28:40	Partial	62S 0.9E	-1.4288	0.2066			
112	3	August 21, 575	17:06:51	Partial	61.5S 123.3W	-1.371	0.3137			
112	4	September 1, 593	0:53:15	Partial	61.1S 110.6E	-1.319	0.41			
112	5	September 12, 611	8:49:34	Partial	60.9S 17.9W	-1.2744	0.4929			
112	6	September 22, 629	16:55:16	Partial	60.8S 148.7W	-1.2369	0.5622			
112	7	October 4, 647	1:10:30	Partial	60.9S 78.1E	-1.2065	0.6186			
112	8	October 14, 665	9:33:22	Partial	61.2S 57W	-1.1819	0.6641			
112	9	October 25, 683	18:04:33	Partial	61.7S 165.7E	-1.1635	0.6981			
112	10	November 5, 701	2:42:23	Partial	62.3S 26.6E	-1.1502	0.7226			
112	11	November 16, 719	11:25:02	Partial	63S 113.8W	-1.1408	0.7402			
112	12	November 26, 737	20:12:02	Partial	63.9S 104.4E	-1.1347	0.7516			
112	13	December 8, 755	5:00:55	Partial	64.8S 38.2W	-1.1301	0.7604			
112	14	December 18, 773	13:51:01	Partial	65.9S 178.5E	-1.1264	0.7678			
112	15	December 29, 791	22:38:40	Partial	67S 35.4E	-1.1206	0.7792			
112	16	January 9, 810	7:25:19	Partial	68S 108W	-1.1139	0.7924			
112	17	January 20, 828	16:07:03	Partial	69.1S 109.3E	-1.1035	0.8129			
112	18	January 31, 846	0:44:07	Partial	70S 32.9W	-1.0889	0.8414			
112	19	February 11, 864	9:14:03	Partial	70.8S 173.9W	-1.0684	0.8814			
112	20	February 21, 882	17:38:16	Partial	71.4S 46E	-1.0431	0.9309			
112	21	March 4, 900	1:54:43	Partial	71.8S 92.6W	-1.0112	0.9933			
112	22	March 15, 918	10:03:27	Total	68.4S 94.4E	-0.973	1.0489	737	2m 53s	
112	23	March 25, 936	18:04:49	Total	59.4S 48.5W	-0.9284	1.0555	496	3m 37s	
112	24	April 6, 954	1:59:15	Total	50.3S 178.9W	-0.8778	1.0611	417	4m 20s	
112	25	April 16, 972	9:46:46	Total	41.4S 56.2E	-0.8213	1.066	376	5m 4s	
112	26	April 27, 990	17:28:21	Total	33S 65.2W	-0.7599	1.07	349	5m 45s	
112	27	May 8, 1008	1:04:50	Total	25.1S 175.9E	-0.694	1.0734	330	6m 22s	
112	28	May 19, 1026	8:37:49	Total	17.8S 58.9E	-0.6251	1.0758	314	6m 52s	
112	29	May 29, 1044	16:06:22	Total	11.1S 56.2W	-0.5525	1.0775	300	7m 12s	
112	30	June 9, 1062	23:34:05	Total	5.2S 170.2W	-0.4793	1.0781	287	7m 20s	
112	31	June 20, 1080	7:00:13	Total	0.2S 76.9E	-0.4047	1.0779	275	7m 18s	
112	32	July 1, 1098	14:28:20	Total	3.8N 35.8W	-0.332	1.0768	263	7m 5s	
112	33	July 11, 1116	21:56:21	Total	6.8N 148W	-0.2594	1.0748	251	6m 46s	
112	34	July 23, 1134	5:29:19	Total	8.6N 99E	-0.191	1.072	238	6m 22s	
112	35	August 2, 1152	13:04:59	Total	9.5N 14.4W	-0.125	1.0685	225	5m 55s	
112	36	August 13, 1170	20:46:50	Total	9.3N 129.3W	-0.0646	1.0645	211	5m 28s	
112	37	August 24, 1188	4:32:58	Total	8.4N 114.6E	-0.0082	1.0598	197	5m 1s	
112	38	September 4, 1206	12:27:26	Total	6.8N 3.7W	0.0409	1.0549	181	4m 36s	
112	39	September 14, 1224	20:27:49	Total	4.7N 123.7W	0.0847	1.0496	165	4m 11s	
112	40	September 26, 1242	4:35:39	Total	2.2N 114.3E	0.1219	1.0443	149	3m 48s	
112	41	October 6, 1260	12:50:25	Total	0.4S 9.6W	0.1527	1.039	132	3m 25s	
112	42	October 17, 1278	21:13:01	Total	3S 135.4W	0.1762	1.0338	116	3m 3s	
112	43	October 28, 1296	5:41:29	Total	5.5S 97.2E	0.1946	1.0289	100	2m 41s	
112	44	November 8, 1314	14:15:05	Total	7.6S 31.3W	0.208	1.0244	85	2m 20s	
112	45	November 18, 1332	22:53:10	Total	9.2S 160.8W	0.2172	1.0202	71	2m 1s	
112	46	November 30, 1350	7:34:51	Hybrid	10.3S 68.8E	0.2227	1.0166	58	1m 42s	
112	47	December 10, 1368	16:17:17	Hybrid	10.5S 61.6W	0.227	1.0135	48	1m 25s	
112	48	December 22, 1386	1:00:27	Hybrid	10S 167.7E	0.23	1.0109	39	1m 10s	
112	49	January 1, 1405	9:41:37	Hybrid	8.6S 37.5E	0.2343	1.0089	32	0m 57s	
112	50	January 12, 1423	18:20:19	Hybrid	6.2S 92.4W	0.24	1.0073	26	0m 48s	
112	51	January 23, 1441	2:52:50	Hybrid	2.9S 138.9E	0.2503	1.0062	22	0m 40s	
112	52	February 3, 1459	11:20:41	Hybrid	1.1N 11.1E	0.2638	1.0054	19	0m 34s	
112	53	February 13, 1477	19:40:23	Hybrid	6N 115W	0.2833	1.0048	17	0m 30s	
112	54	February 25, 1495	3:52:03	Hybrid	11.5N 120.5E	0.309	1.0044	16	0m 27s	
112	55	March 7, 1513	11:54:03	Hybrid	17.6N 1.8W	0.3421	1.004	15	0m 24s	
112	56	March 18, 1531	19:47:21	Hybrid	24.3N 122.1W	0.3818	1.0036	13	0m 21s	
112	57	March 29, 1549	3:30:55	Hybrid	31.4N 120.1E	0.4285	1.0029	11	0m 16s	
112	58	April 9, 1567	11:04:08	Hybrid	38.9N 4.9E	0.483	1.002	8	0m 11s	
112	59	April 29, 1585	18:28:58	Hybrid	46.6N 107.7W	0.5436	1.0005	2	0m 3s	
112	60	May 11, 1603	1:44:59	Annular	54.7N 142.6E	0.6107	0.9987	6	0m 7s	
112	61	May 21, 1621	8:53:44	Annular	63.1N 36.1E	0.6828	0.9962	18	0m 18s	
112	62	June 1, 1639	15:55:16	Annular	71.7N 65.3W	0.7597	0.993	38	0m 31s	
112	63	June 11, 1657	22:52:09	Annular	80.5N 153.7W	0.8395	0.9888	73	0m 45s	
112	64	June 23, 1675	5:44:39	Annular	84.1N 166.1W	0.9219	0.9835	154	1m 1s	
112	65	July 3, 1693	12:33:52	Partial	64.8N 146.3E	1.0058	0.9718			
112	66	July 15, 1711	19:22:11	Partial	63.9N 34.6E	1.0894	0.8216			
112	67	July 26, 1729	2:10:40	Partial	63.1N 76.9W	1.1718	0.6746			
112	68	August 6, 1747	9:01:21	Partial	62.4N 171.3E	1.2512	0.5339			
112	69	August 16, 1765	15:54:02	Partial	61.8N 59.2E	1.3279	0.3994			
112	70	August 27, 1783	22:52:06	Partial	61.4N 54.1W	1.3991	0.2757			
112	71	September 8, 1801	5:54:40	Partial	61.1N 168.5W	1.4657	0.1614			
112	72	September 19, 1819	13:03:47	Partial	61N 75.6E	1.5258	0.0595			
