= State Archives of Genoa =

State archival institution in Genoa, Italy

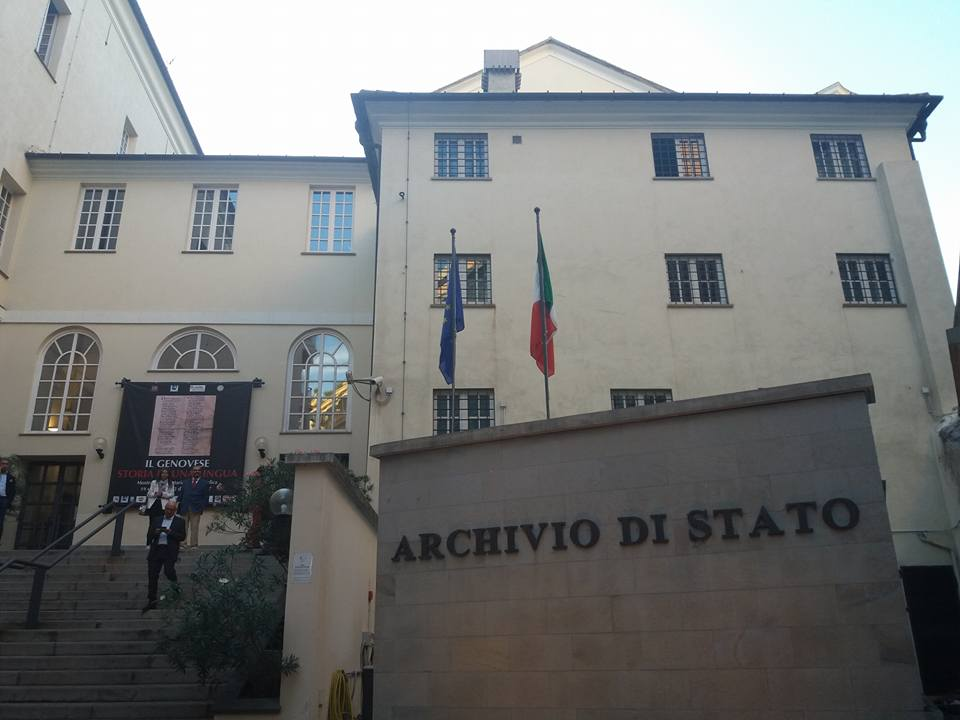
- Interactive map of State Archives of Genoa
- 44°24′12″N 8°56′12″E
- Location: Genoa, Liguria, Italy
- Type: State archive
- Website: http://www.archiviodistatogenova.beniculturali.it/

The State Archives of Genoa (Italian: Archivio di Stato di Genova) is a public archival institution located in Genoa, Italy. It preserves historical records produced by governmental and administrative institutions that operated in the city and surrounding territory and forms part of the national archival network administered by the Italian Ministry of Culture.

The archive preserves documentation relating to the institutions of the former Republic of Genoa, including records produced by the political, administrative, and judicial bodies of the republic. It also holds records from the subsequent administrations of the Ligurian Republic, the Kingdom of Sardinia, the Kingdom of Italy, and the Italian Republic.

== History ==
The archival system was established in Genoa in 1817. In 2004, the archives were moved to the Sant'Ignazo complex of the Carignano district.

== Sources ==
- "Archivio di Stato di Genova" (PDF). Guida generale degli Archivi di Stato italiani. Vol. II. Rome: Ministero per i beni culturali e ambientali. 1983. pp. 299–353.
- "Archivio di Stato di Genova". Sistema archivistico nazionale (in Italian). Istituto centrale per gli archivi.
