= Point Mosquitos =

Point on the Caribbean coast of Panama in Central America

Coordinates: 9.109°N 77.873°W

Point Mosquitos (Spanish: Punta Mosquitos or Mosquito) is a point on the Caribbean coast of Panama in Central America. It lies beside the Mosquitos Channel.

== History ==
Point Mosquitos is sometimes connected with Comagre, the capital of the Indians under the cacique Carlos encountered by Vasco Núñez de Balboa and the origin of the English word savanna. (Note: See the entry in the Oxford English Dictionary which derives it from Richard Eden's translation of Peter Martyr's collected letters but which, however, repeats the error that the word derives from Taino rather than that of the Panamanian Indians.)
