= Belén River =

River in Panama

Belén River Yebra

Location
- Country: Panama

The Belén River is a river in Panama.

== Discovery ==
It was discovered by Christopher Columbus during his fourth—and last—voyage to the New World, following a two-year search for a passage to the Pacific Ocean and the Far East. In January 1503, he established a garrison after having been informed of the existence of gold mines upriver in the jungle. According to Columbus' account, Chief Quibian, who led the Guaymí people, realized that the Europeans were not leaving, and thus on 6 April 1503, the Guaymí attacked the garrison, which Columbus and his men promptly abandoned. Ten days later, Columbus left for Spain and never returned to the Americas.

== See also ==
- List of rivers of Panama
