= Caribbean =

Islands and coastal region surrounded by the Caribbean Sea

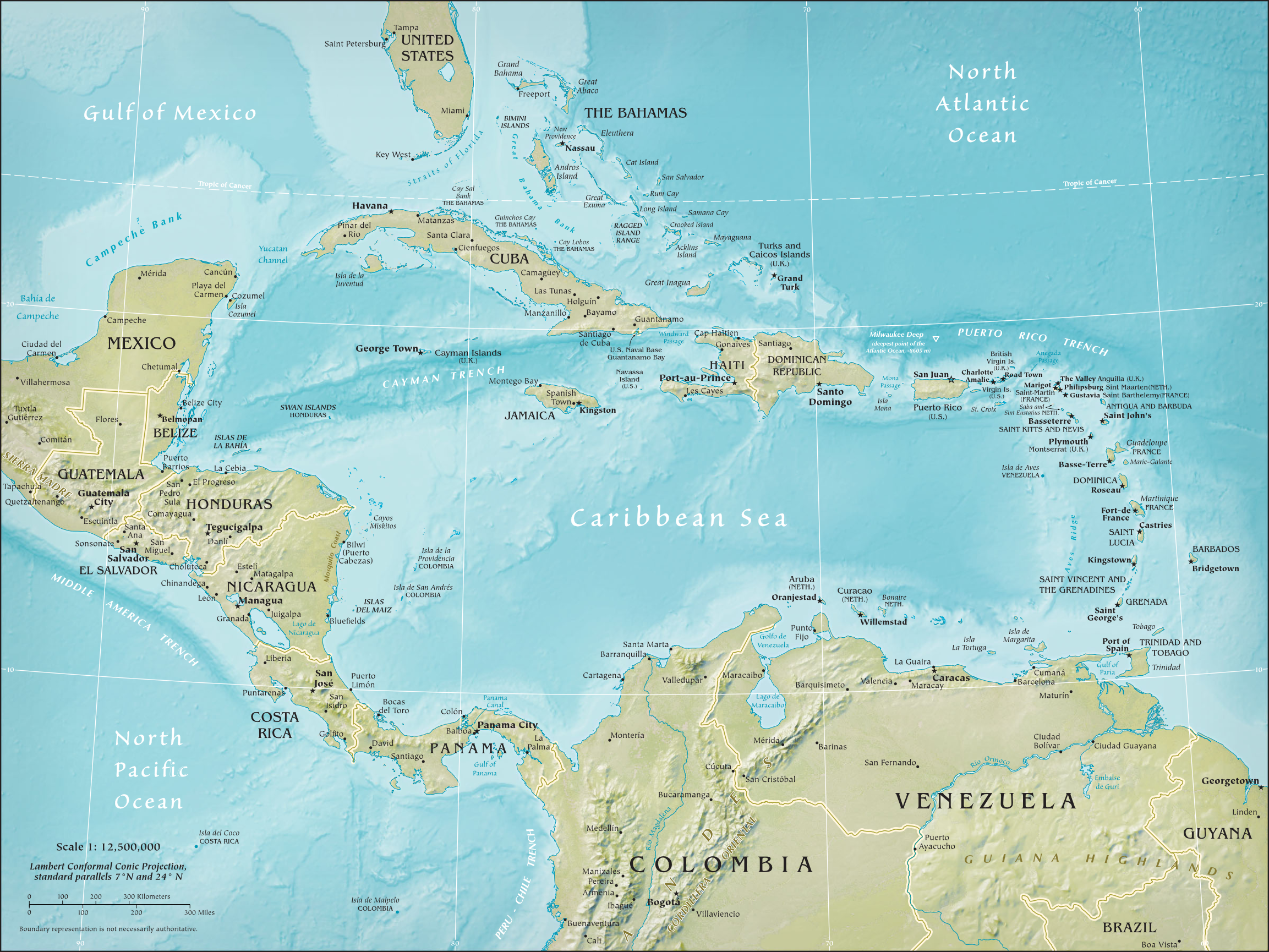
- Map of the Caribbean region of the Americas
- Area: 239,681 km^{2} (92,541 sq mi)
- Population: 44,182,048
- Population density: 151.5/km^{2} (392/sq mi)
- Ethnic groups: Afro-Caribbean; Indo-Caribbean and other Asian-Caribbean; White-Caribbean; Mixed-Caribbean; Indigenous Caribbean
- Religions: 73.5% Christianity; 52.3% Catholicism; 20.2% Protestantism; 1.0% other Christian; 20.6% no religion; 2.5% Folk religions; 2.1% Hinduism; 1.3% others
- Demonym: Caribbean, West Indian
- Countries: 13: Antigua and Barbuda; Bahamas; Barbados; Cuba; Dominica; Dominican Republic; Grenada; Haiti; Jamaica; Saint Kitts and Nevis; Saint Lucia; Saint Vincent and the Grenadines; Trinidad and Tobago
- Time zone: UTC−05:00 to UTC−04:00
- Internet TLD: Multiple
- Calling codes: Multiple
- Largest cities: Largest Cities: Santo Domingo; Port-au-Prince; Port of Spain; San Juan; Havana; Kingston; Santiago de los Caballeros; Santiago de Cuba; Willemstad; Oranjestad; Punta Cana; Cap-Haïtien; Nassau; Paramaribo; Chetumal; Spanish Town; Porlamar; Cayenne; Georgetown; Bridgetown; San Fernando; Belize City
- UN M49 codes: 029 – Caribbean; 419 003 – North America Latin America and the Caribbean; 019 – Americas; 001 – World

The Caribbean (Note: Pronounced /ˌkærɪˈbiːən, kəˈrɪbiən/ KARR-ih-BEE-ən, kə-RIB-ee-ən, locally /ˈkærɪbiæn/ KARR-ih-bee-an; Spanish: el Caribe; French: les Caraïbes; Dutch: de Caraïben.) is a geo-political region in the middle of the Americas centered around the Caribbean Sea in the North Atlantic Ocean, mostly overlapping with the West Indies. Bordered by North America to the north and also the west through Central America, and South America to the south, it comprises numerous islands, cays, islets, reefs, and banks.

It includes the Lucayan Archipelago and Antilles of the West Indies; the Quintana Roo islands and Belizean islands of the Yucatán Peninsula; and the Bay Islands, Miskito Cays, Archipelago of San Andrés, Providencia and Santa Catalina, Corn Islands, and San Blas Islands of Central America. It also includes the coastal areas on the continental mainland of the Americas bordering the region from the Yucatán Peninsula in North America through Central America to the Guianas in South America.

Caribbean as seen from space at night, 2012

== Overview ==
Island groups comprising the West Indies in the Caribbean

Situated largely on the Caribbean plate, the region has thousands of islands, islets, reefs, and cays. Island arcs delineate the northern and eastern edges of the Caribbean Sea: the Greater Antilles in the north and the Lesser Antilles, which includes the Leeward Islands, Windward Islands, and the Leeward Antilles, to the east and south. The nearby northwestern Lucayan Archipelago, comprising The Bahamas and the Turks and Caicos Islands, and the island of Barbados in the Lesser Antilles, are considered to be a part of the Caribbean despite not bordering the Caribbean Sea. All the islands in the Antilles, including the Lucayan Archipelago, form the West Indies, a term often interchangeable with the Caribbean. The archipelago of Bermuda is not part of the Caribbean, as it lies in the Sargasso Sea to the north, but it is an associate member of the Caribbean Community.

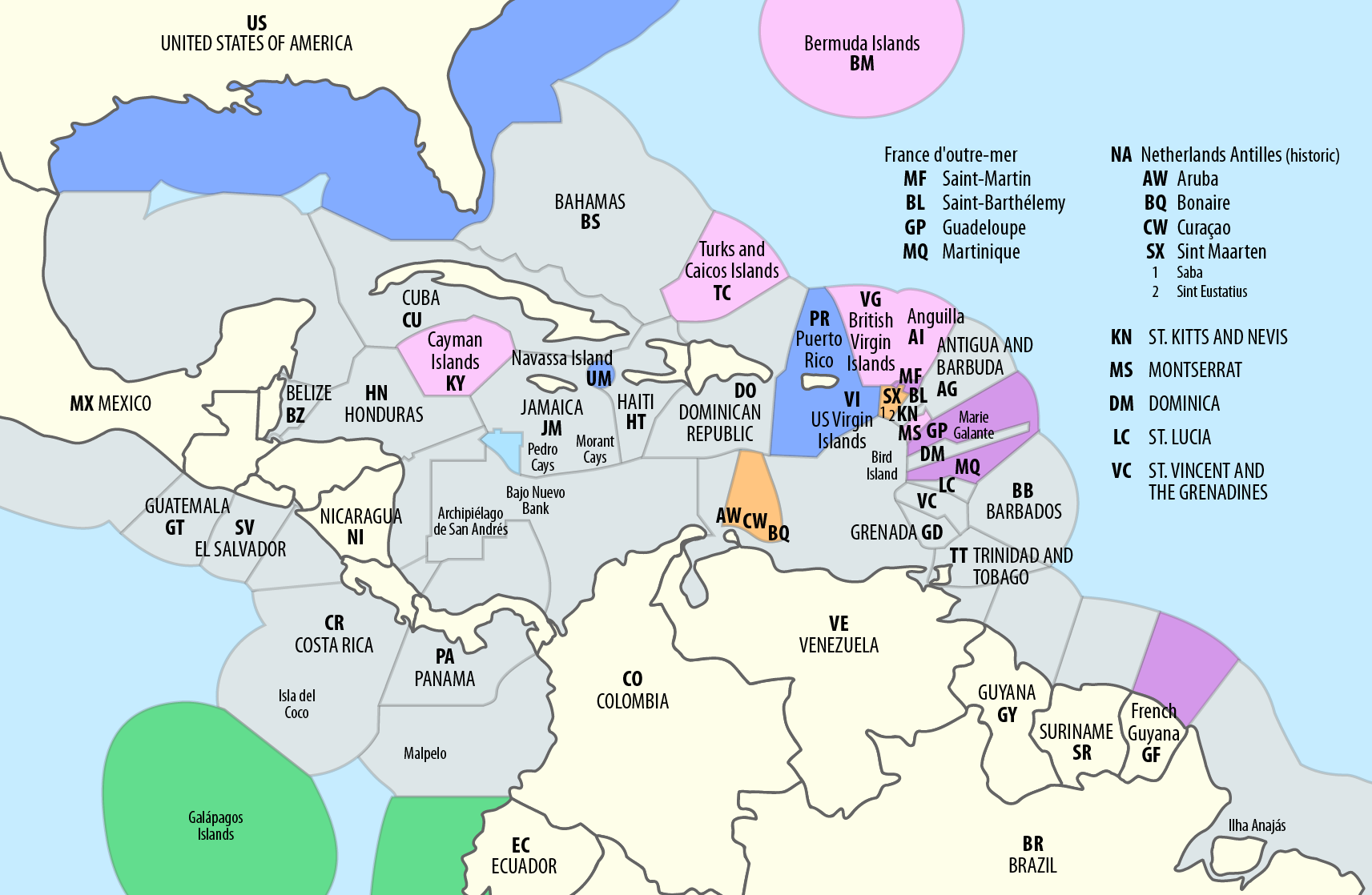
Exclusive economic zones (EEZ) in the Caribbean, with American zones in blue, British in pink, French in purple, Dutch in orange, and Ecuadorian in green

On the continental mainland of the Americas, the Caribbean coasts of Mexico, Central America, and South America, including the Yucatán Peninsula of Mexico, Bay Islandz Department of Honduras, the Mosquitia region, Cartagena and Barranquilla in Colombia, Maracaibo and Cumaná in Venezuela, are considered part of the Caribbean. As with the coastal areas of the mainland, Guyana, Suriname, and French Guiana, even if they do not border the Caribbean Sea, are often completely included within the Caribbean due to their strong political and cultural ties with the region.

Geopolitically, the islands of the Caribbean are often regarded as a subregion of North America, though sometimes they are included in Middle America, or regarded as its own subregion as the Caribbean. The Caribbean is sometimes considered alongside Central America as a region.

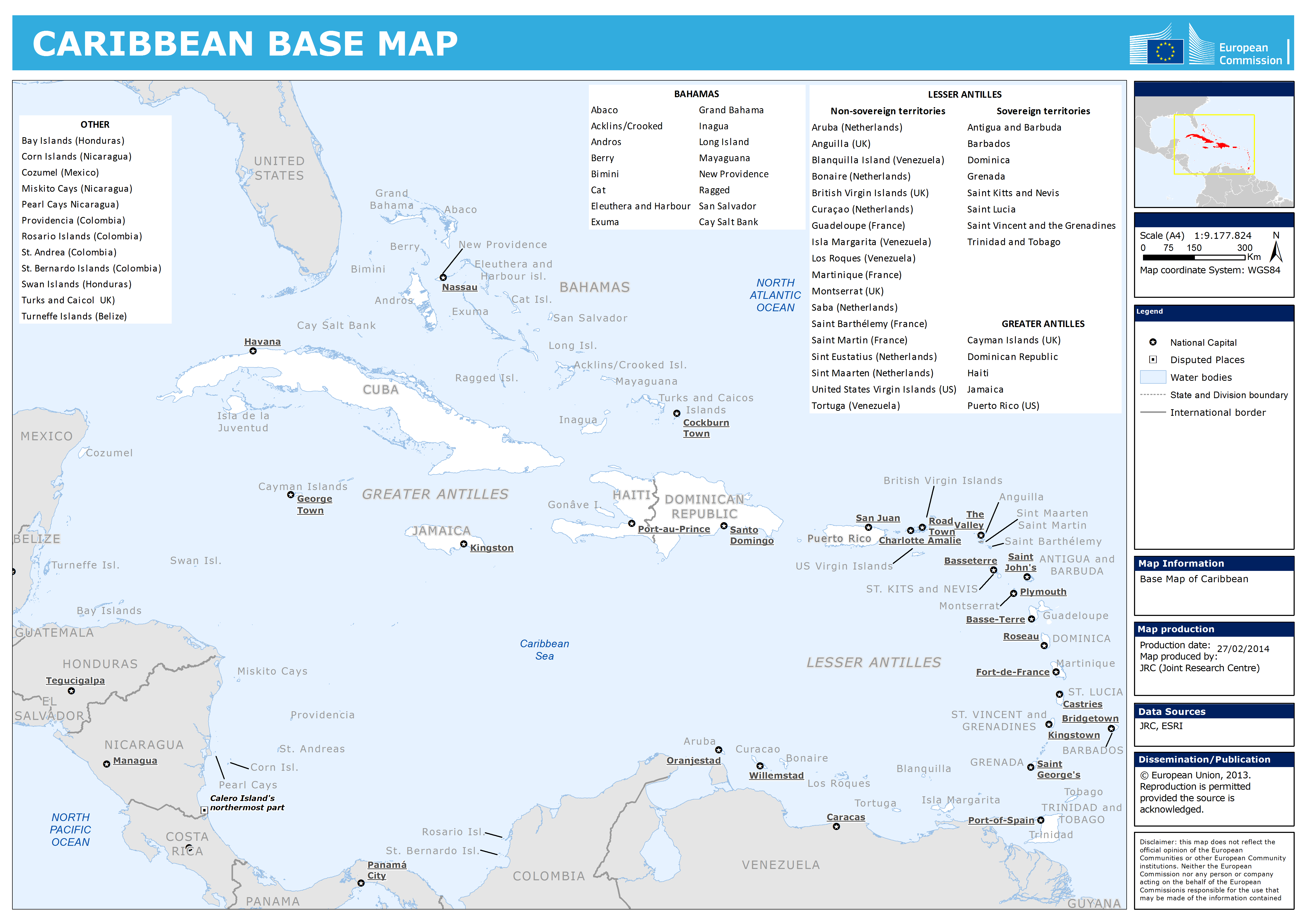
Political map of Caribbean

Generally, the Caribbean region is organized into 33 political entities, including 13 sovereign states, 12 dependencies, 7 overseas territories, and various disputed territories. From 15 December 1954 to 10 October 2010, there was a territory known as the Netherlands Antilles composed of six islands, all of which were Dutch dependencies. From 3 January 1958 to 31 May 1962, there was also a short-lived political union called the British West Indies Federation composed of ten English-speaking Caribbean territories, all of which were then British dependencies.

The modern Caribbean is one of the most ethnically diverse regions on the planet, as a result of European colonization by the Spanish, English, Dutch, and French; the Atlantic slave trade from Africa; indentured servitude from the Indian subcontinent and East Asia; as well as modern immigration from around the world.

== Etymology and pronunciation ==
The region takes its name from the Caribs, an Amerindian ethnic group historically present in the Lesser Antilles and parts of adjacent South America that the Spanish colonists named the region after at the time of the European conquest of the Americas.

The two most prevalent pronunciations of "Caribbean" outside the Caribbean are /ˌkærɪˈbiːən/ (KARR-ə-BEE-ən), with the primary stress on the third syllable, and /kəˈrɪbiən/ (kə-RIB-ee-ən), with the stress on the second. Most authorities of the last century preferred the stress on the third syllable. This is the older of the two pronunciations, but the stressed-second-syllable variant has been established for over 75 years. It has been suggested that speakers of British English prefer /ˌkærɪˈbiːən/ (KARR-ə-BEE-ən) while North American speakers more typically use /kəˈrɪbiən/ (kə-RIB-ee-ən), but major American dictionaries and other sources list the stress on the third syllable as more common in American English too. According to the American version of Oxford Online Dictionaries, the stress on the second syllable is becoming more common in UK English and is increasingly considered "by some" to be more up to date and more "correct".

The Oxford Online Dictionaries claim the stress on the second syllable is the most common pronunciation in the Caribbean itself, but according to the Dictionary of Caribbean English Usage, the most common pronunciation in Caribbean English stresses the first syllable instead, /ˈkærɪbiæn/ (KARR-ih-bee-an).

== Definition ==
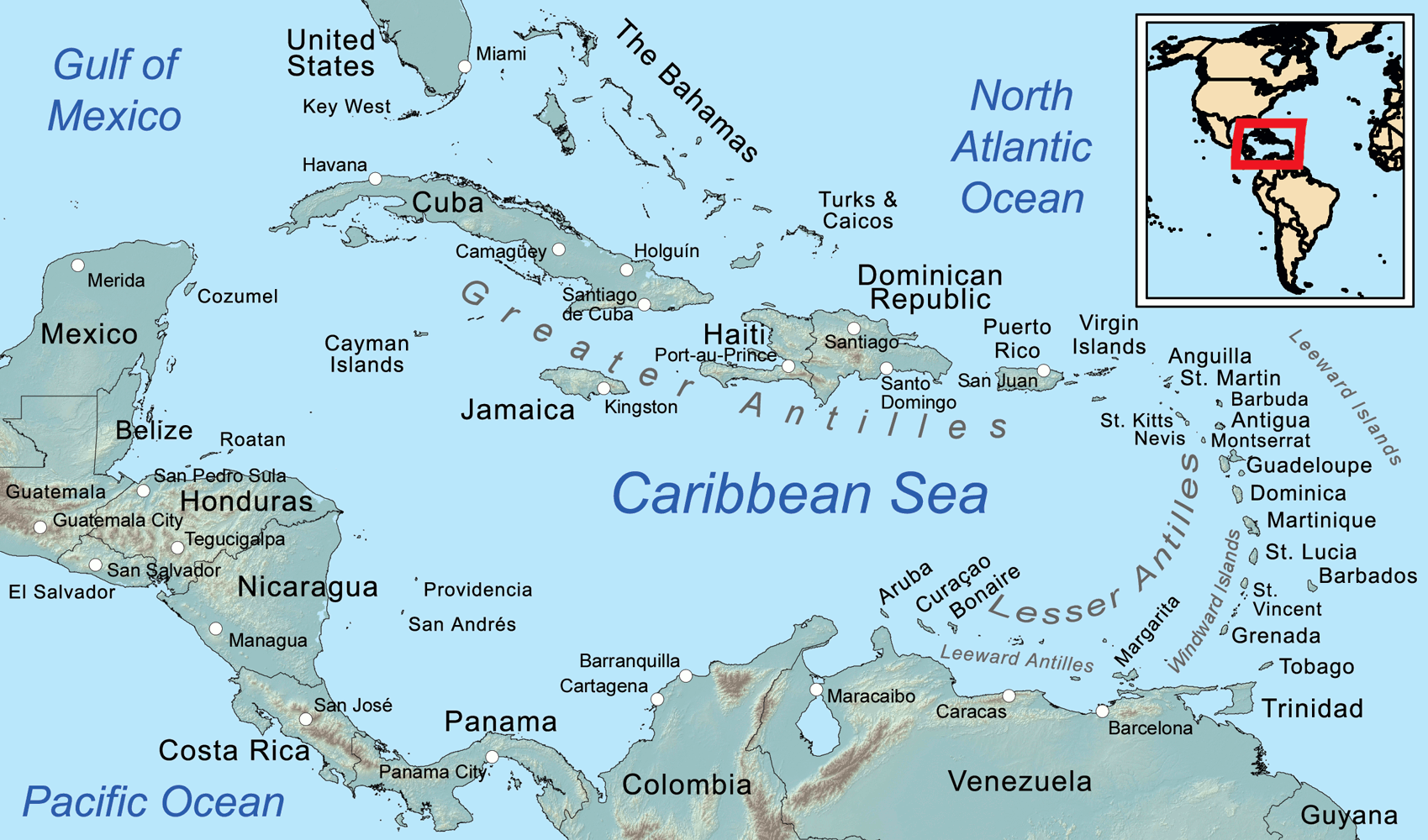
Map of the Caribbean

The word Caribbean has multiple uses. Its principal ones are geographical and political. The Caribbean can also be expanded to include territories with strong cultural and historical connections to Africa, slavery, European colonisation and the plantation system.

- The United Nations geoscheme for the Americas presents the Caribbean as a distinct region within the Americas.
- Physiographically, the Caribbean region is mainly a chain of islands surrounding the Caribbean Sea. To the north, the region is bordered by the Gulf of Mexico, the Straits of Florida and the Northern Atlantic Ocean, which lies to the east and northeast. To the south lies the coastline of the continent of South America.

== History ==
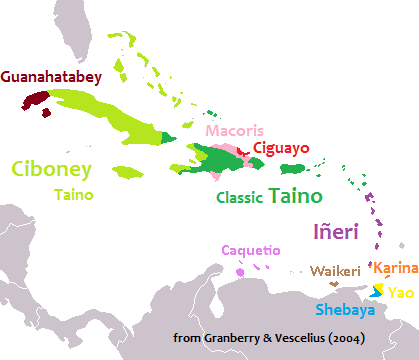
Pre-Columbian languages of the West Indies. Ciboney Taíno, Classic Taíno, and Iñeri were Arawakan, Karina and Yao were Cariban. Macorix, Ciguayo and Guanahatabey are unclassified.

The oldest evidence of humans in the Caribbean is in southern Trinidad at Banwari Trace, where remains have been found from 7,000 years ago. These pre-ceramic sites, which belong to the Archaic (pre-ceramic) age, have been termed Ortoiroid. The earliest archaeological evidence of human settlement in Hispaniola dates to about 3600 BC, but the reliability of these finds is questioned. Consistent dates of 3100 BC appear in Cuba. The earliest dates in the Lesser Antilles are from 2000 BC in Antigua. A lack of pre-ceramic sites in the Windward Islands and differences in technology suggest that these Archaic settlers may have Central American origins. Whether an Ortoiroid colonization of the islands took place is uncertain, but there is little evidence of one.

DNA studies changed some of the traditional beliefs about pre-Columbian indigenous history. According to National Geographic, "studies confirm that a wave of pottery-making farmers—known as Ceramic Age people—set out in canoes from the northeastern coast of South America starting some 2,500 years ago and island-hopped across the Caribbean. They were not, however, the first colonizers. On many islands they encountered a foraging people who arrived some 6,000 or 7,000 years ago ... The ceramicists, who are related to today's Arawak-speaking peoples, supplanted the earlier foraging inhabitants—presumably through disease or violence—as they settled new islands."

Between 400 BC and 200 BC, the first ceramic-using agriculturalists, the Saladoid culture, entered Trinidad from South America. They expanded up the Orinoco River to Trinidad, and then spread rapidly up the islands of the Caribbean. Some time after 250 AD another group, the Barancoid, entered Trinidad. The Barancoid society collapsed along the Orinoco around 650 AD and another group, the Arauquinoid, expanded into these areas and up the Caribbean chain. Around 1300 AD a new group, the Mayoid, entered Trinidad and remained the dominant culture until Spanish settlement.

At the time of the European discovery of most of the islands of the Caribbean, three major Amerindian indigenous peoples lived on the islands: the Taíno in the Greater Antilles, The Bahamas and the Leeward Islands; the Island Caribs and Galibi in the Windward Islands; and the Ciboney in western Cuba. The Taínos are subdivided into Classic Taínos, who occupied Puerto Rico and part of Hispaniola; Western Taínos, who occupied the Bahamian archipelago, Cuba, Jamaica, and part of Hispaniola; and the Eastern Taínos, who occupied the northern Lesser Antilles. The southern Lesser Antilles, including Martinique and Trinidad, were inhabited by both Carib-speaking and Arawak-speaking groups.

=== European contact ===
Christopher Columbus arrived in the Caribbean on the island of Hispaniola in 1492. Soon afterward, both Portuguese and Spanish explorers began claiming territories in Central and South America. These early colonies brought gold to Europe; most specifically England, the Netherlands, and France. These nations hoped to establish profitable colonies in the Caribbean. Colonial rivalries made the Caribbean a battleground for European wars for centuries.

In 1512, after pressure from Dominican friars, the Laws of Burgos were introduced by the Spanish Crown to better protect the rights of the New World natives. The Spanish used a form of slavery called the Encomienda, where slaves would be awarded to the conquistadors, who were charged with protecting and converting their slaves. This had a devastating impact on the population, so starting in 1503, slaves from Africa were imported to the colony. Jamaica was ceded to England by Spain while both Martinique and the western third of Hispaniola were ceded to France.

While early slave traders were Portuguese and Spanish, known as the First Atlantic System, by the 17th century the trade became dominated by British, French, and Dutch merchants. This was known as the Second Atlantic System. 5 million African slaves would be taken to the Caribbean, and around half would be traded to the British Caribbean islands. Slavery was abolished first in the Dutch Empire in 1814. Spain abolished slavery in its empire in 1811, with the exceptions of Cuba, Puerto Rico, and Santo Domingo. Slavery was not abolished in Cuba until 1886. Britain abolished the slave trade in 1807, and slavery proper in 1833. France abolished slavery in its colonies in 1848.

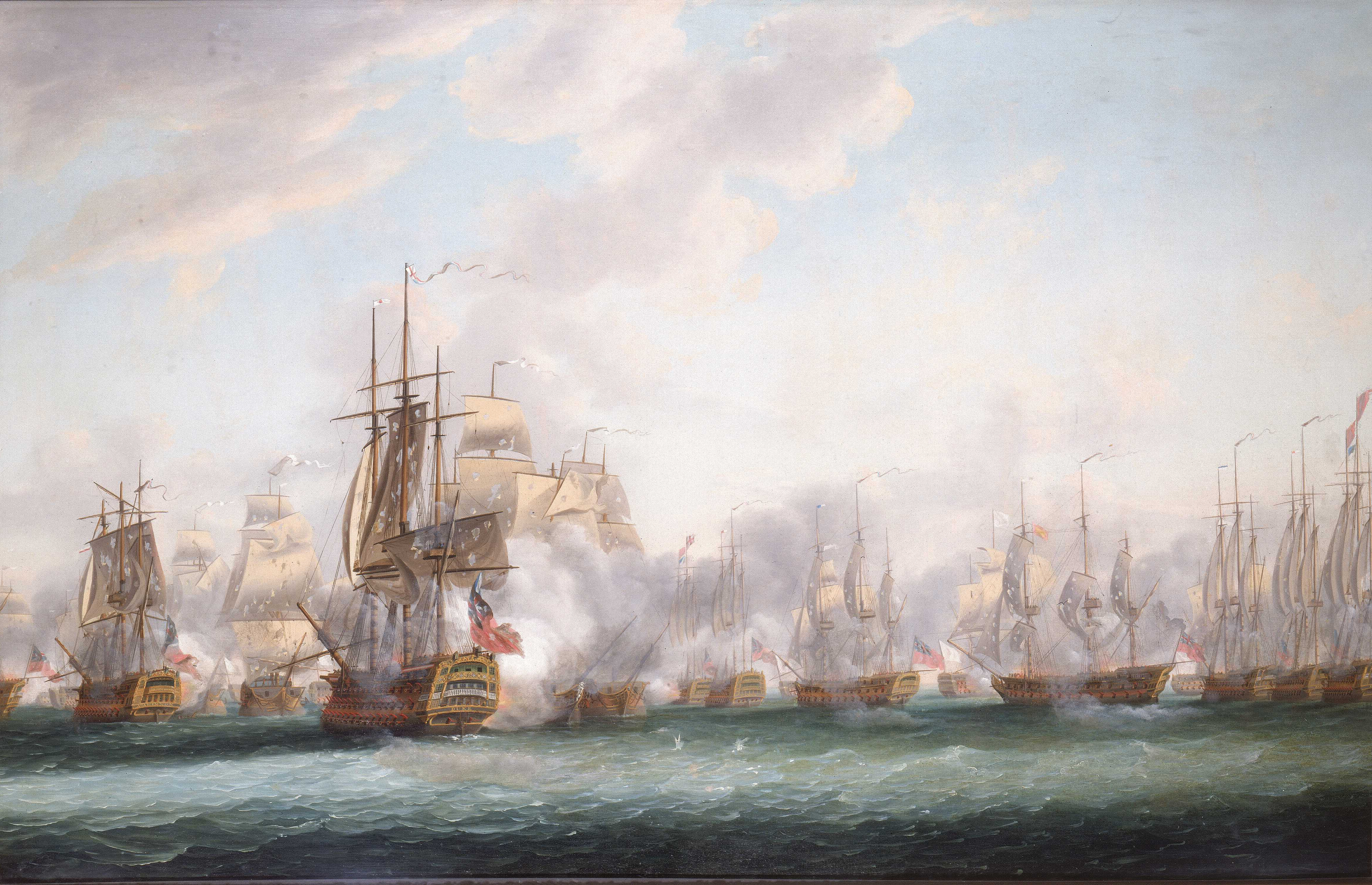
The Battle of the Saintes between British and French fleets in 1782, by Nicholas Pocock

The Caribbean was known for pirates, especially between 1640 and 1680. The term "buccaneer" is often used to describe a pirate operating in this region. The Caribbean region was war-torn throughout much of its colonial history, but the wars were often based in Europe, with only minor battles fought in the Caribbean. Some wars, however, were born of political turmoil in the Caribbean itself.

==== Decolonisation and modern period ====
In 1791, a slave rebellion in the French colony of Saint-Domingue led to the establishment in 1804 of Haiti, the first republic in the Caribbean. Neighboring Santo Domingo (present-day Dominican Republic) would attain its independence on three separate occasions in 1821, 1844 and 1865. Cuba became independent in 1898 following American intervention in the War of Independence during the Spanish-American war. Following the war, Spain's last colony in the Americas, Puerto Rico, became an unincorporated territory of the United States. The U.S. also took control of Cuba. The U.S., since the Monroe Doctrine in the 19th century, has excerted a major influence over the Caribbean. The so-called Banana Wars in the early 20th century saw the temporary U.S. occupations of Haiti and the Dominican Republic.

Between the 1960s and '80s, most of the British holdings in the Caribbean achieved political independence, starting with Jamaica in 1962, then Trinidad and Tobago (1962), Guyana (1966), Barbados (1966), The Bahamas (1973), Grenada (1974), Dominica (1978), St. Lucia (1979), St. Vincent and the Grenadines (1979), Belize (1981) Antigua and Barbuda (1981), and St. Kitts and Nevis (1983). In case of the Netherlands, Suriname achieved independence in 1975, while the Netherlands Antilles received autonomy status within the Kingdom in 1954, with Aruba receiving its own in 1986 and Curaçao and St. Maarten in 2010. Presently, the United States, Britain, France and the Netherlands still have some Caribbean possessions. During the Cold War, the U.S. would again intervene militarily into Caribbean countries including Cuba, the Dominican Republic and Grenada.

The decline of the export industries meant a need to diversify the economies of the Caribbean territories. The tourism industry started developing in the early 20th century, rapidly developing in the 1960s when regular international flights made vacations affordable and is now a $50 billion industry. Another industry that developed in the early 20th century was offshore banking and financial services, particularly in The Bahamas and the Cayman Islands, as the proximity of the Caribbean islands to North America made them an attractive location for branches of foreign banks seeking to avail themselves of less complicated regulations and lower tax rates.

== Geography ==
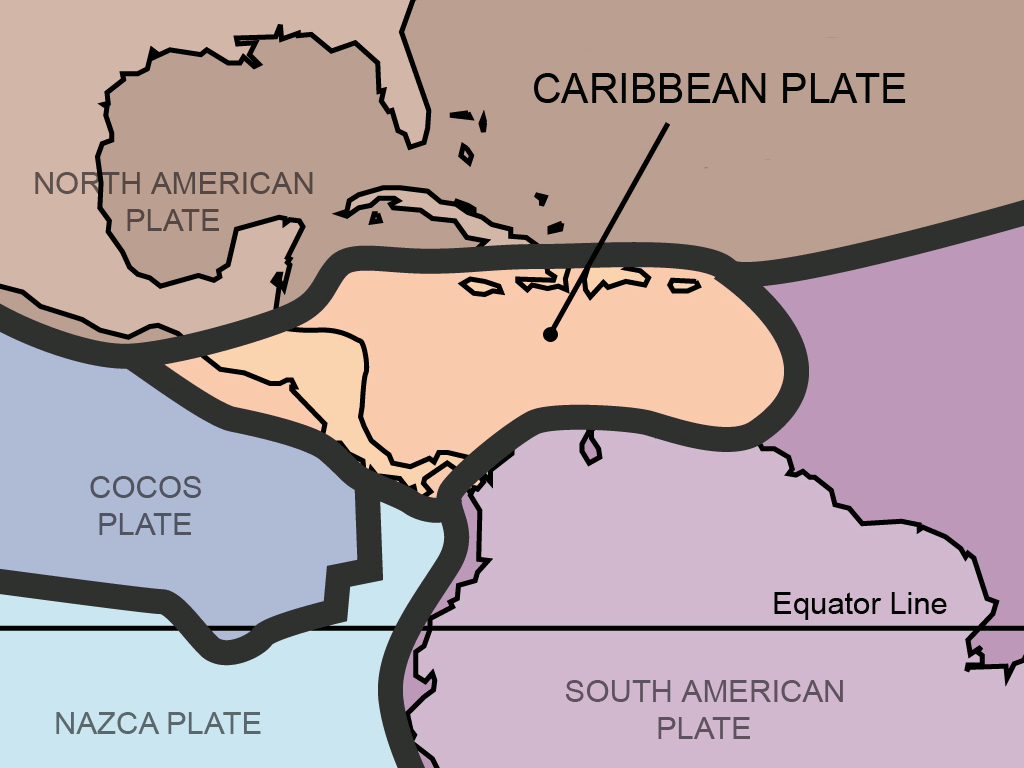
The Caribbean plate is the reason islands exist here. On the north, obduction has scraped rocks onto the North American plate (such as in western Cuba). On the east, the Lesser Antilles subduction zone produces volcanism and an island arc. Complex interactions with the South American plate has created islands along the southern boundary. Coral islands are found in insular Colombia near the east coast of Central America.

The geography and climate in the Caribbean region varies: Some islands in the region have relatively flat terrain of non-volcanic origin. These islands include Aruba (which has minor volcanic features), Curaçao, Barbados, Bonaire, the Cayman Islands, Saint Croix, The Bahamas, and Antigua. Others possess rugged towering mountain-ranges like the islands of Saint Martin, Cuba, Hispaniola, Puerto Rico, Jamaica, Dominica, Montserrat, Saba, Sint Eustatius, Saint Kitts, Saint Lucia, Saint Thomas, Saint John, Tortola, Grenada, Saint Vincent, Guadeloupe, Martinique and Trinidad and Tobago.

Definitions of the terms Greater Antilles and Lesser Antilles often vary. As part of the Puerto Rico Bank and the Puerto Rico-Virgin Islands microplate, the Virgin Islands are sometimes included with the Greater Antilles. The term Lesser Antilles is often used to define an island arc that includes Grenada but excludes Trinidad and Tobago and the Leeward Antilles.

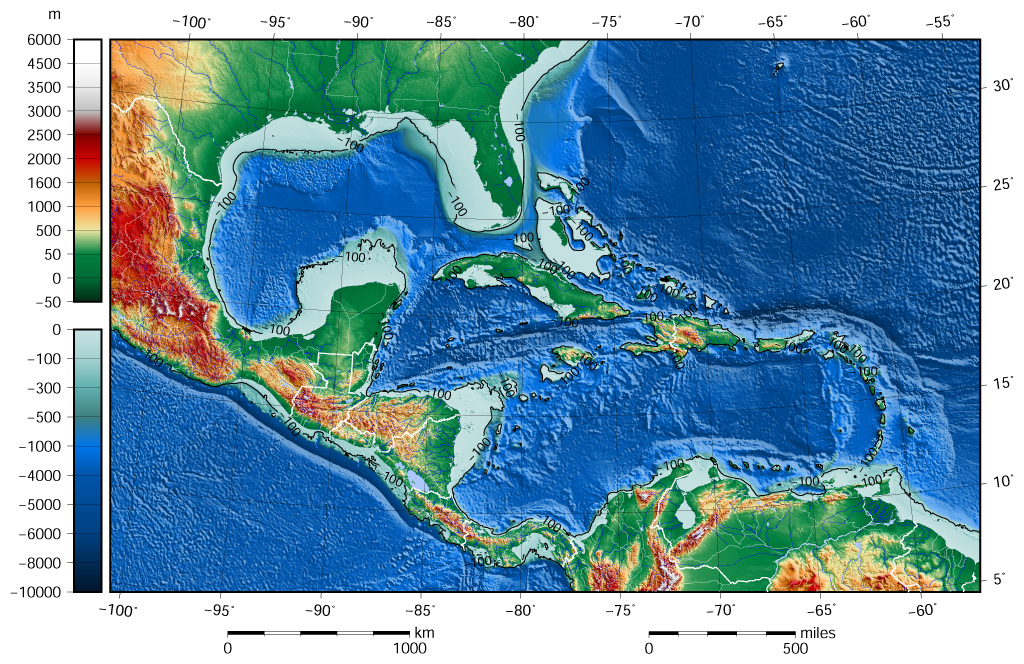
Topography and bathymetry in the Caribbean with a 100 m (328 ft) depth contour, delimiting shallow underwater landforms, including the Bahamas, Puerto Rico, and Rosalind banks

The waters of the Caribbean Sea host large, migratory schools of fish, turtles, and coral reef formations. The Puerto Rico Trench, located on the fringe of the Atlantic Ocean and Caribbean Sea just to the north of the island of Puerto Rico, is the deepest point in all of the Atlantic Ocean.

The region sits in the line of several major shipping routes with the Panama Canal connecting the western Caribbean Sea with the Pacific Ocean.

=== Climate ===
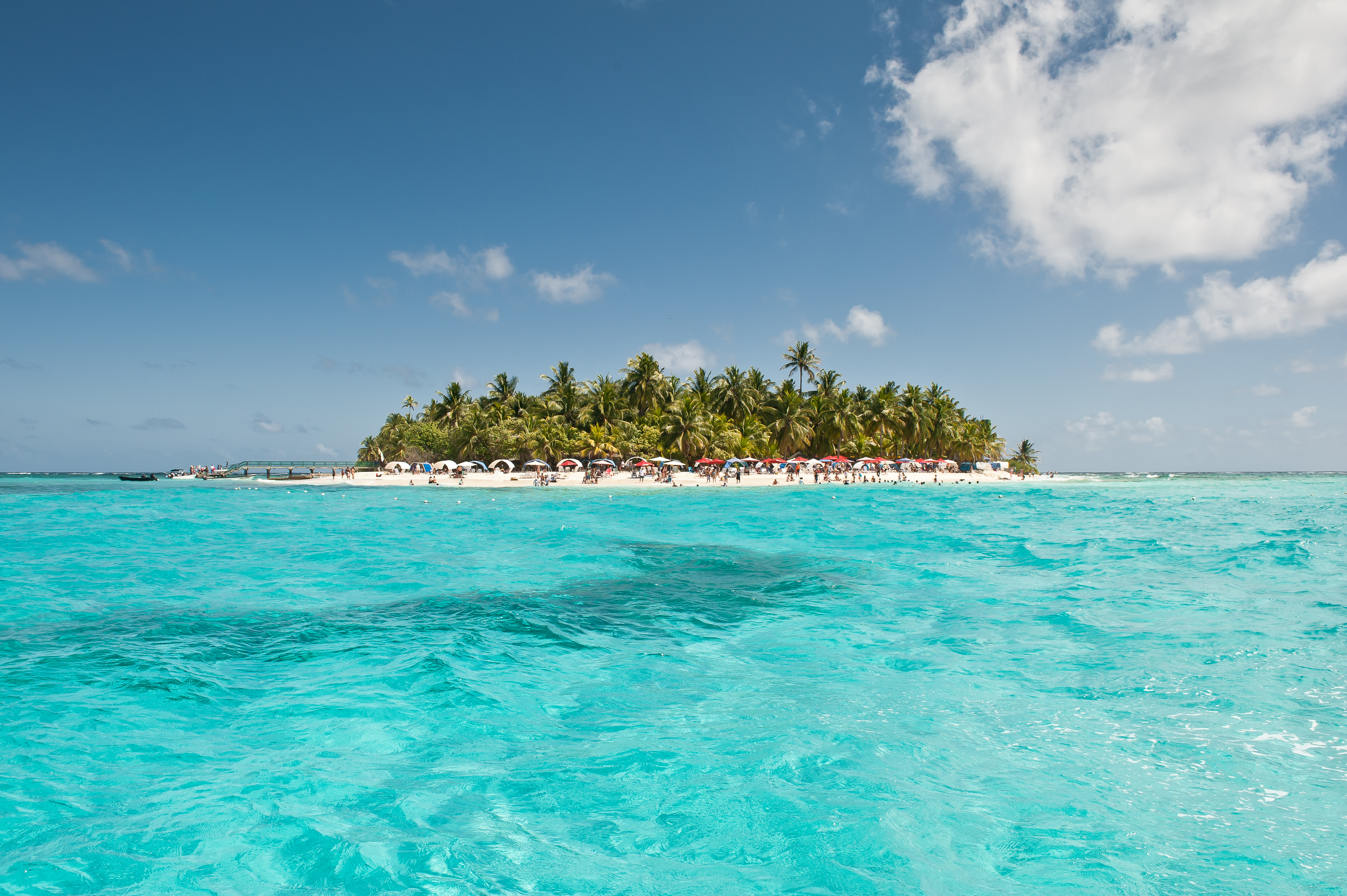
Tropical monsoon climate in San Andrés island, Caribbean, Colombia.

Köppen climate map of the islands of the Caribbean.

The climate of the area is tropical, varying from tropical rainforest in some areas to tropical monsoon and tropical savanna in others. There are also some locations that are arid climates with considerable drought in some years, and the peaks of mountains tend to have cooler temperate climates.

Rainfall varies with elevation, size and water currents, such as the cool upwellings that keep the ABC islands arid. Warm, moist trade winds blow consistently from the east, creating both rain forest and semi arid climates across the region. The tropical rainforest climates include lowland areas near the Caribbean Sea from Costa Rica north to Belize, as well as the Dominican Republic and Puerto Rico, while the more seasonal dry tropical savanna climates are found in Cuba, northern Colombia and Venezuela, and southern Yucatán, Mexico. Arid climates are found along the extreme northern coast of Venezuela out to the islands including Aruba and Curaçao, as well as the northwestern tip of Yucatán.

While the region generally is sunny much of the year, the wet season from May through November sees more frequent cloud cover (both broken and overcast), while the dry season from December through April is more often clear to mostly sunny. Seasonal rainfall is divided into 'dry' and 'wet' seasons, with the latter six months of the year being wetter than the first half. The air temperature is hot much of the year, varying from 25 to 33 C (77 F to 90 F) between the wet and dry seasons. Seasonally, monthly mean temperatures vary from about 5 C (7 F) in the northern most regions, to less than 3 C in the southernmost areas of the Caribbean.

Hurricane season is from June to November, but they occur more frequently in August and September and more common in the northern islands of the Caribbean. Hurricanes that sometimes batter the region usually strike northward of Grenada and to the west of Barbados. The principal hurricane belt arcs to northwest of the island of Barbados in the Eastern Caribbean. A great example being recent events of Hurricane Irma devastating the island of Saint Martin during the 2017 hurricane season.

Sea surface temperatures change little annually, normally running from 30 °C (87 °F) in the warmest months to 26 °C (76 °F) in the coolest months. The air temperature is warm year round, in the 70s, 80s and 90s, and varies from winter to summer about 2–5 degrees on the southern islands and about a 10–20 degrees difference on the northern islands of the Caribbean. The northern islands, like The Bahamas, Cuba, Puerto Rico and the Dominican Republic, may be influenced by continental masses during winter months, such as cold fronts.

Aruba: Latitude 12°N

Climate data for Oranjestad, Aruba (1981–2010, extremes 1951–2010)
| Month | Jan | Feb | Mar | Apr | May | Jun | Jul | Aug | Sep | Oct | Nov | Dec | Year |
|---|---|---|---|---|---|---|---|---|---|---|---|---|---|
| Record high °C (°F) | 32.5 (90.5) | 33.0 (91.4) | 33.9 (93.0) | 34.4 (93.9) | 34.9 (94.8) | 35.2 (95.4) | 35.3 (95.5) | 36.1 (97.0) | 36.5 (97.7) | 35.4 (95.7) | 35.0 (95.0) | 34.8 (94.6) | 36.5 (97.7) |
| Mean daily maximum °C (°F) | 30.0 (86.0) | 30.4 (86.7) | 30.9 (87.6) | 31.5 (88.7) | 32.0 (89.6) | 32.2 (90.0) | 32.0 (89.6) | 32.6 (90.7) | 32.7 (90.9) | 32.1 (89.8) | 31.3 (88.3) | 30.4 (86.7) | 31.5 (88.7) |
| Daily mean °C (°F) | 26.7 (80.1) | 26.8 (80.2) | 27.2 (81.0) | 27.9 (82.2) | 28.5 (83.3) | 28.7 (83.7) | 28.6 (83.5) | 29.1 (84.4) | 29.2 (84.6) | 28.7 (83.7) | 28.1 (82.6) | 27.2 (81.0) | 28.1 (82.6) |
| Mean daily minimum °C (°F) | 24.5 (76.1) | 24.7 (76.5) | 25.0 (77.0) | 25.8 (78.4) | 26.5 (79.7) | 26.7 (80.1) | 26.4 (79.5) | 26.8 (80.2) | 26.9 (80.4) | 26.4 (79.5) | 25.8 (78.4) | 25.0 (77.0) | 25.9 (78.6) |
| Record low °C (°F) | 21.3 (70.3) | 20.6 (69.1) | 21.4 (70.5) | 21.5 (70.7) | 21.8 (71.2) | 22.7 (72.9) | 21.2 (70.2) | 21.3 (70.3) | 22.1 (71.8) | 21.9 (71.4) | 22.0 (71.6) | 20.5 (68.9) | 20.5 (68.9) |
| Average precipitation mm (inches) | 39.3 (1.55) | 20.6 (0.81) | 8.7 (0.34) | 11.6 (0.46) | 16.3 (0.64) | 18.7 (0.74) | 31.7 (1.25) | 25.8 (1.02) | 45.5 (1.79) | 77.8 (3.06) | 94.0 (3.70) | 81.8 (3.22) | 471.8 (18.58) |
Source: DEPARTAMENTO METEOROLOGICO ARUBA, (extremes)

Puerto Rico: Latitude 18°N

Climate data for San Juan, Puerto Rico
| Month | Jan | Feb | Mar | Apr | May | Jun | Jul | Aug | Sep | Oct | Nov | Dec | Year |
|---|---|---|---|---|---|---|---|---|---|---|---|---|---|
| Record high °C (°F) | 33 (92) | 36 (96) | 36 (96) | 36 (97) | 36 (96) | 36 (97) | 35 (95) | 35 (95) | 36 (97) | 36 (97) | 37 (98) | 36 (96) | 34 (94) |
| Mean daily maximum °C (°F) | 28 (83) | 29 (84) | 29 (85) | 30 (86) | 31 (87) | 32 (89) | 31 (88) | 31 (88) | 32 (89) | 31 (88) | 30 (86) | 29 (84) | 30 (86) |
| Mean daily minimum °C (°F) | 22 (72) | 22 (72) | 23 (73) | 23 (74) | 24 (76) | 26 (78) | 26 (78) | 26 (78) | 26 (78) | 25 (77) | 24 (75) | 23 (73) | 24 (75) |
| Record low °C (°F) | 16 (61) | 17 (62) | 16 (60) | 18 (64) | 18 (64) | 19 (66) | 21 (69) | 20 (68) | 21 (69) | 19 (67) | 18 (65) | 17 (62) | 16 (61) |
| Average precipitation mm (inches) | 95 (3.7) | 60 (2.4) | 49 (1.9) | 118 (4.6) | 150 (5.9) | 112 (4.4) | 128 (5.0) | 138 (5.4) | 146 (5.7) | 142 (5.6) | 161 (6.3) | 126 (5.0) | 1,431 (56.3) |
Source: The National Weather Service

Cuba: at Latitude 22°N

Climate data for Havana
| Month | Jan | Feb | Mar | Apr | May | Jun | Jul | Aug | Sep | Oct | Nov | Dec | Year |
|---|---|---|---|---|---|---|---|---|---|---|---|---|---|
| Record high °C (°F) | 32.5 (90.5) | 33.0 (91.4) | 35.9 (96.6) | 36.4 (97.5) | 36.9 (98.4) | 37.2 (99.0) | 38.0 (100.4) | 36.1 (97.0) | 37.5 (99.5) | 35.4 (95.7) | 35.0 (95.0) | 34.8 (94.6) | 38.0 (100.4) |
| Mean daily maximum °C (°F) | 25.8 (78.4) | 26.1 (79.0) | 27.6 (81.7) | 28.6 (83.5) | 29.8 (85.6) | 30.5 (86.9) | 31.3 (88.3) | 31.6 (88.9) | 31.0 (87.8) | 29.2 (84.6) | 27.7 (81.9) | 26.5 (79.7) | 28.8 (83.8) |
| Daily mean °C (°F) | 22.2 (72.0) | 22.4 (72.3) | 23.7 (74.7) | 24.8 (76.6) | 26.1 (79.0) | 27.0 (80.6) | 27.6 (81.7) | 27.9 (82.2) | 27.4 (81.3) | 26.1 (79.0) | 24.5 (76.1) | 23.0 (73.4) | 25.2 (77.4) |
| Mean daily minimum °C (°F) | 18.6 (65.5) | 18.6 (65.5) | 19.7 (67.5) | 20.9 (69.6) | 22.4 (72.3) | 23.4 (74.1) | 23.8 (74.8) | 24.1 (75.4) | 23.8 (74.8) | 23.0 (73.4) | 21.3 (70.3) | 19.5 (67.1) | 21.6 (70.9) |
| Record low °C (°F) | 5.1 (41.2) | 5.6 (42.1) | 5.4 (41.7) | 11.5 (52.7) | 16.8 (62.2) | 19.7 (67.5) | 18.2 (64.8) | 19.3 (66.7) | 19.1 (66.4) | 11.9 (53.4) | 10.0 (50.0) | 7.5 (45.5) | 5.1 (41.2) |
| Average rainfall mm (inches) | 64.4 (2.54) | 68.6 (2.70) | 46.2 (1.82) | 53.7 (2.11) | 98.0 (3.86) | 182.3 (7.18) | 105.6 (4.16) | 99.6 (3.92) | 144.4 (5.69) | 180.5 (7.11) | 88.3 (3.48) | 57.6 (2.27) | 1,189.2 (46.84) |
Source: World Meteorological Organisation (UN), Climate-Charts.com

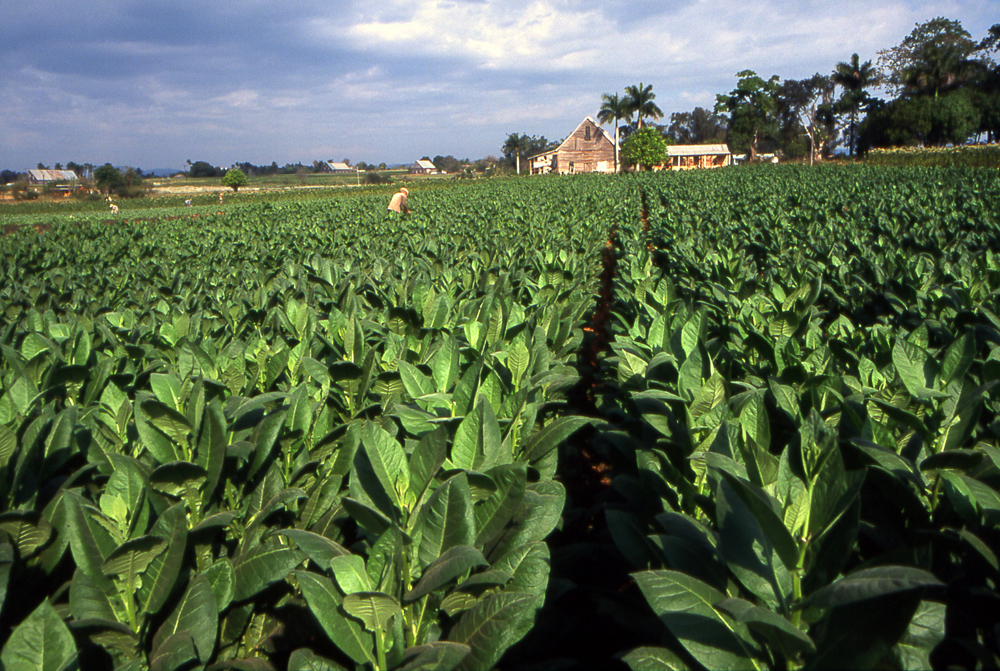
A field in Pinar del Rio planted with Cuban tobacco

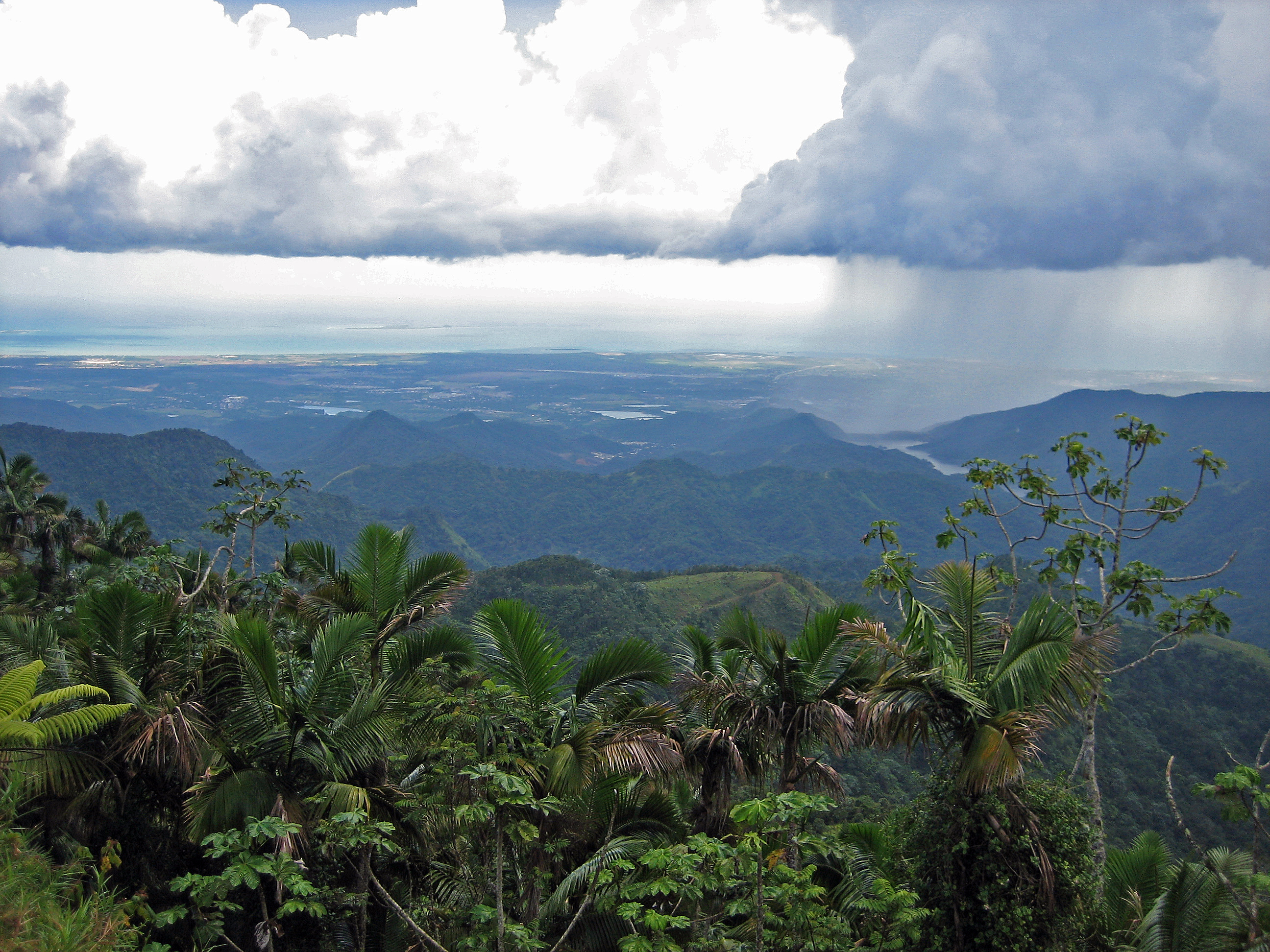
Puerto Rico's south shore, from the Cordillera Central in Jayuya

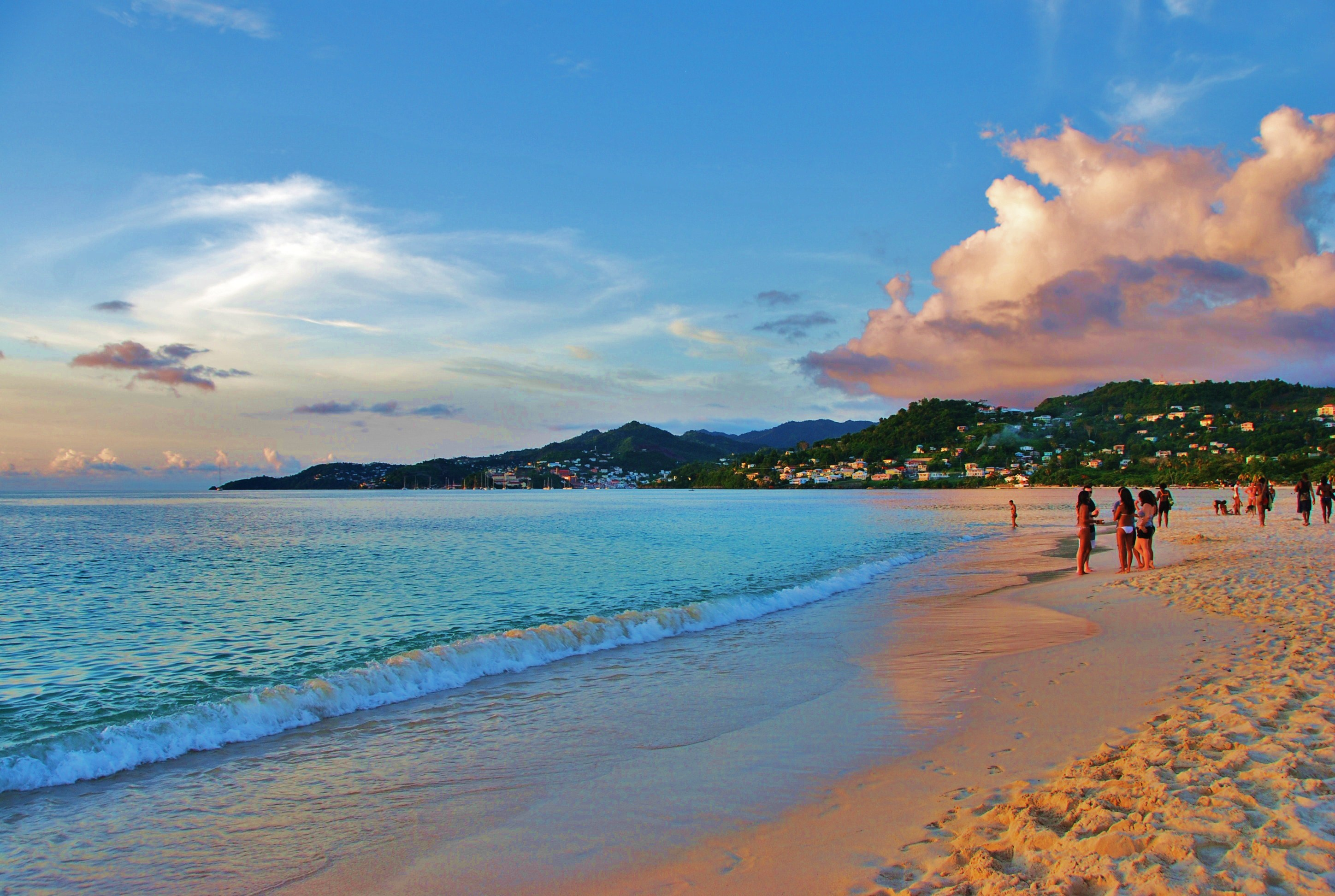
Grand Anse beach, St. George's, Grenada

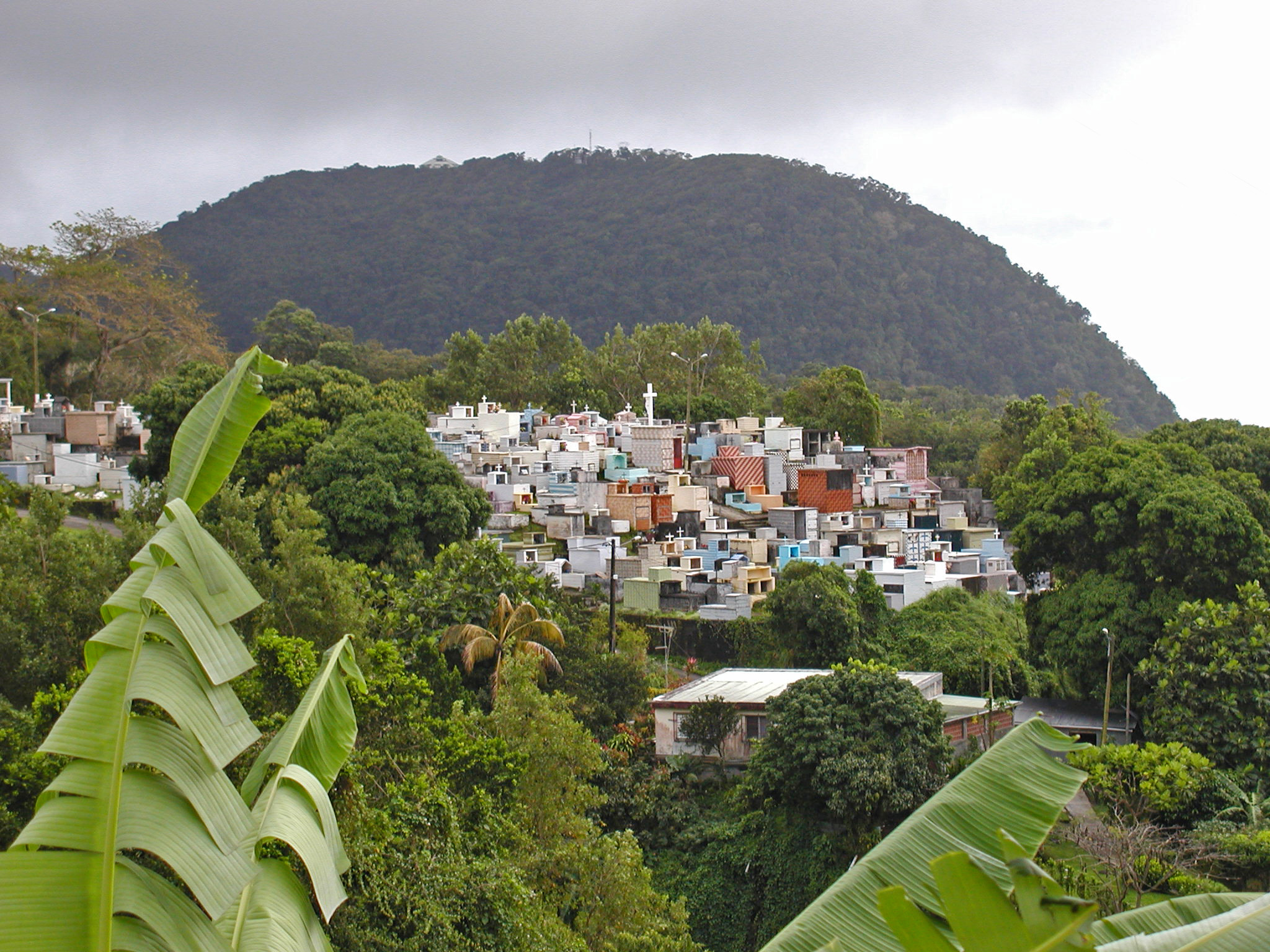
A church cemetery perched in the mountains of Guadeloupe

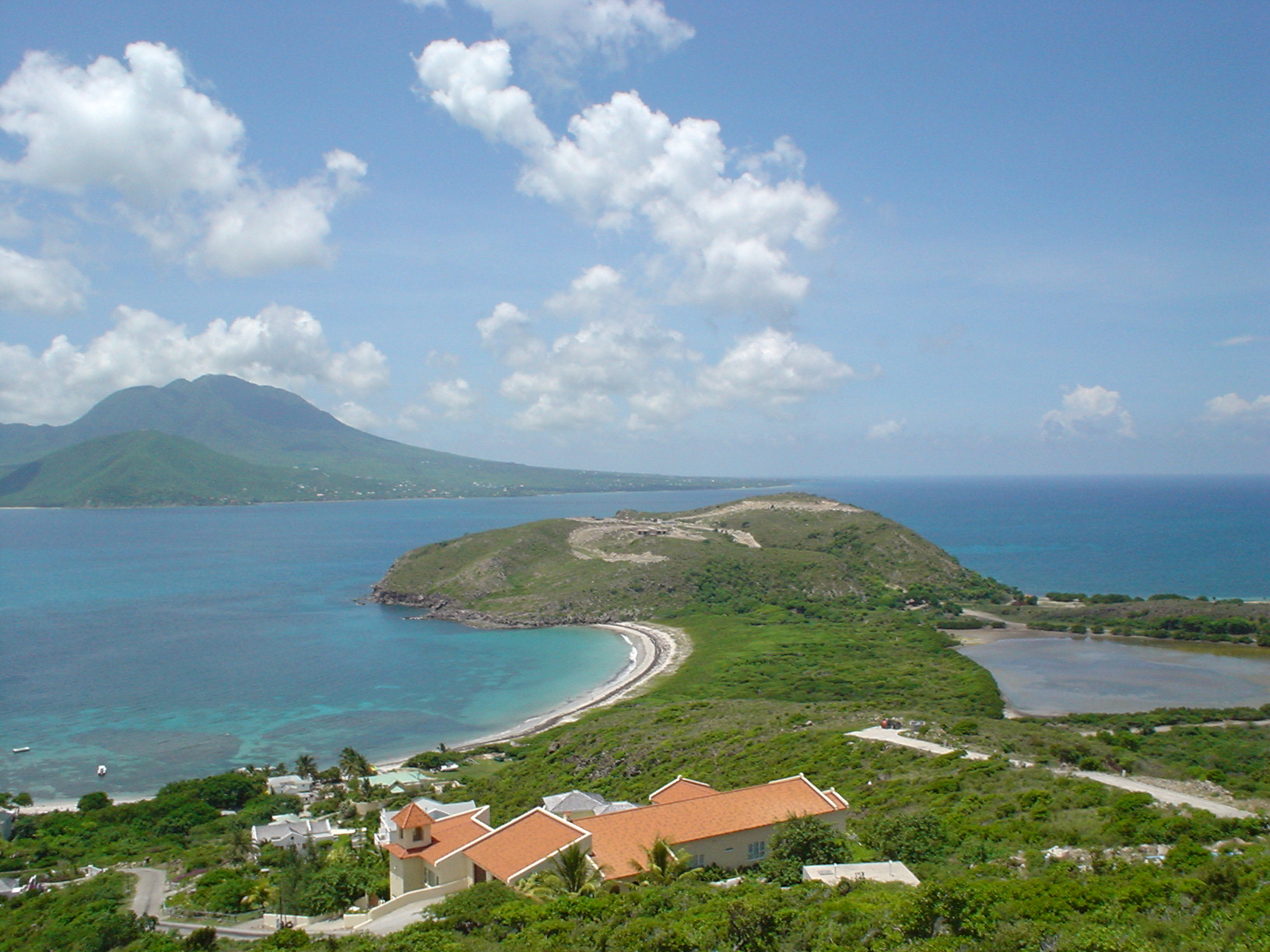
A view of Nevis island from the southeastern peninsula of Saint Kitts

=== Island groups ===
Lucayan Archipelago (Note: The Lucayan Archipelago is excluded from some definitions of "Caribbean" and instead classified as Atlantic; this is primarily a geological rather than cultural or environmental distinction.)

- The Bahamas
- Turks and Caicos Islands (United Kingdom)

Greater Antilles

- Cuba
- Cayman Islands (United Kingdom)
- Jamaica
- Hispaniola
  - Haiti
  - Dominican Republic
- Puerto Rico (U.S. Commonwealth)
  - Spanish Virgin Islands
- (United States) Navassa Island

Lesser Antilles

- Leeward Islands
  - United States Virgin Islands (U.S.)
    - Saint Croix
    - Saint Thomas
    - Saint John
    - Water Island
  - British Virgin Islands (United Kingdom)
    - Tortola
    - Virgin Gorda
    - Anegada
    - Jost Van Dyke
  - Anguilla (United Kingdom)
  - Saint Martin, politically divided between
    - Saint Martin (France)
    - Sint Maarten (Kingdom of the Netherlands)
  - Saint Barthélemy (French Antilles, France)
  - Antigua and Barbuda
    - Antigua
    - Barbuda
    - Redonda
  - Saba (Caribbean Netherlands, Netherlands)
  - Sint Eustatius (Caribbean Netherlands, Netherlands)
  - Saint Kitts and Nevis
    - Saint Kitts
    - Nevis
  - Montserrat (United Kingdom)
  - Guadeloupe (French Antilles, France) including
    - Les Saintes
    - Marie-Galante
    - La Désirade
- Windward Islands
  - Dominica
  - Martinique (French Antilles, France)
  - Saint Lucia
  - Saint Vincent and the Grenadines
    - Saint Vincent
    - The Grenadines
  - Barbados
  - Grenada
    - Grenada
    - Carriacou and Petite Martinique
  - Trinidad and Tobago
    - Tobago
    - Trinidad
- Leeward Antilles
  - Aruba (Kingdom of the Netherlands)
  - Curaçao (Kingdom of the Netherlands)
  - Bonaire (Caribbean Netherlands, Netherlands)

=== Historical groupings ===
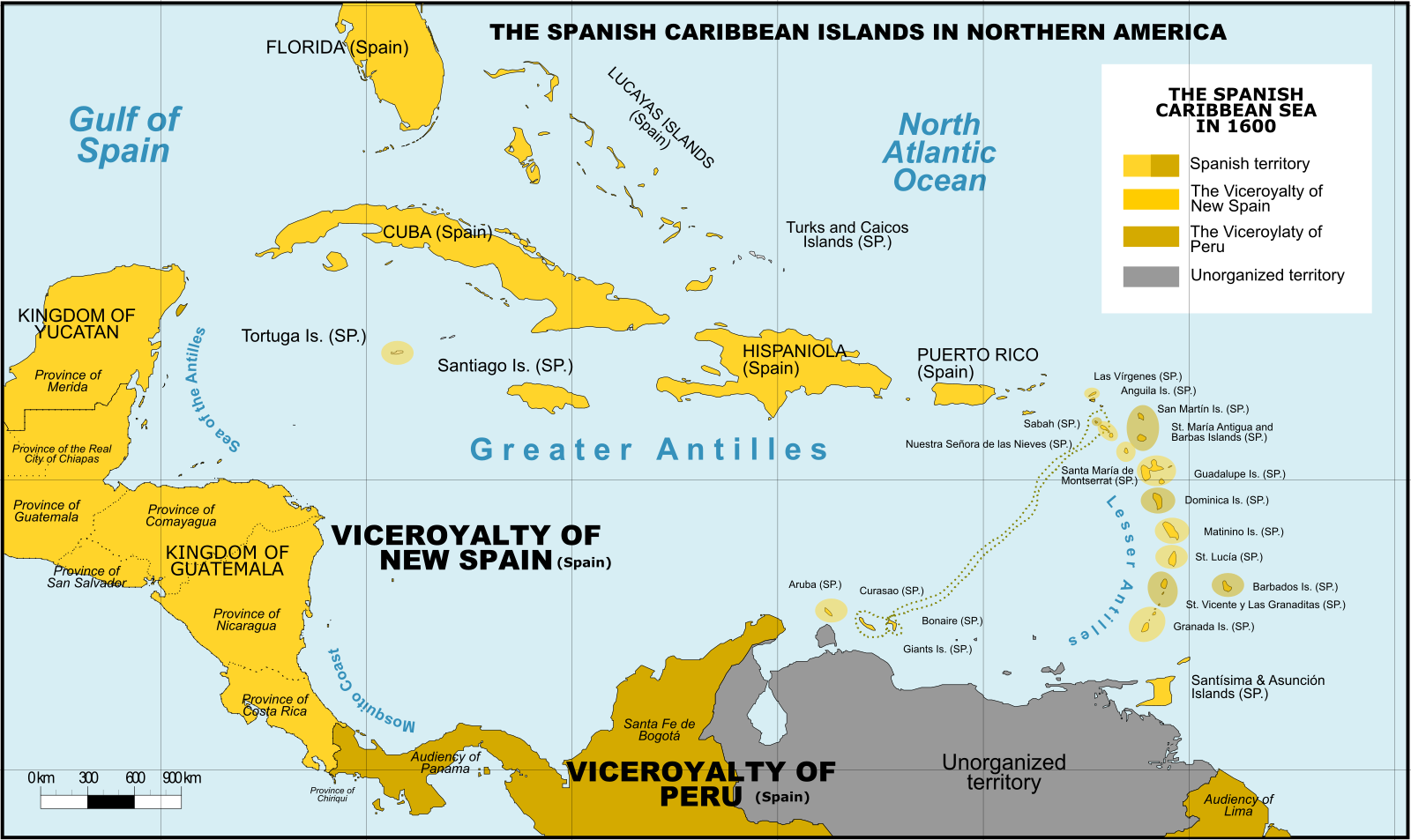
Spanish Caribbean Islands in the American Viceroyalties 1600

Political evolution of Central America and the Caribbean from 1700 to present

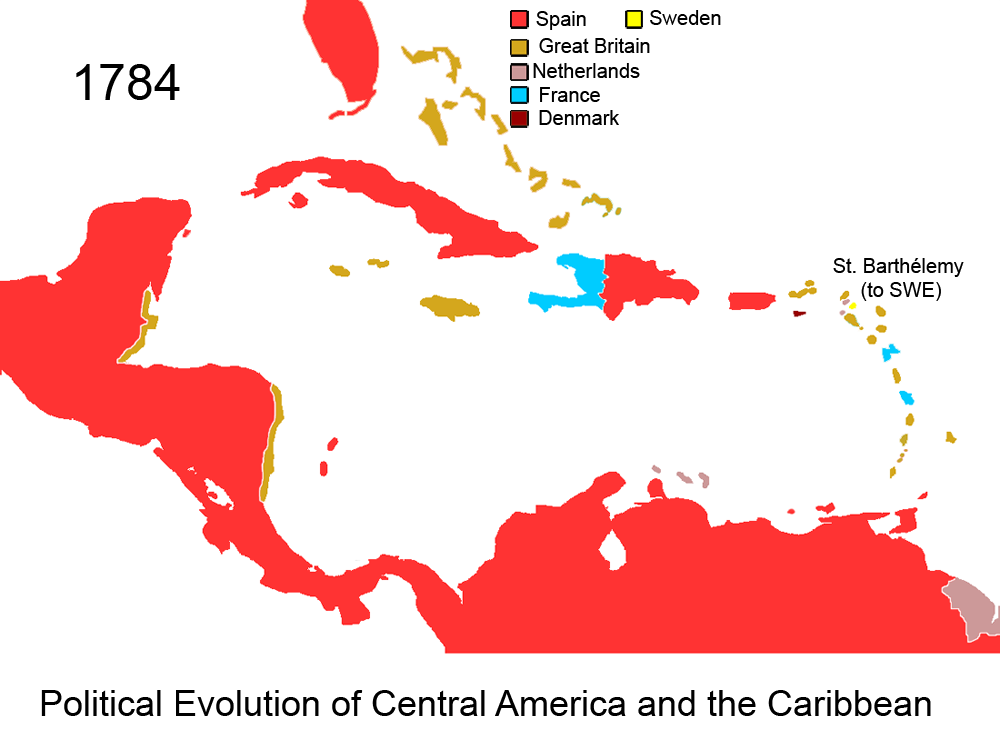
The mostly Spanish-controlled Caribbean in the 18th century

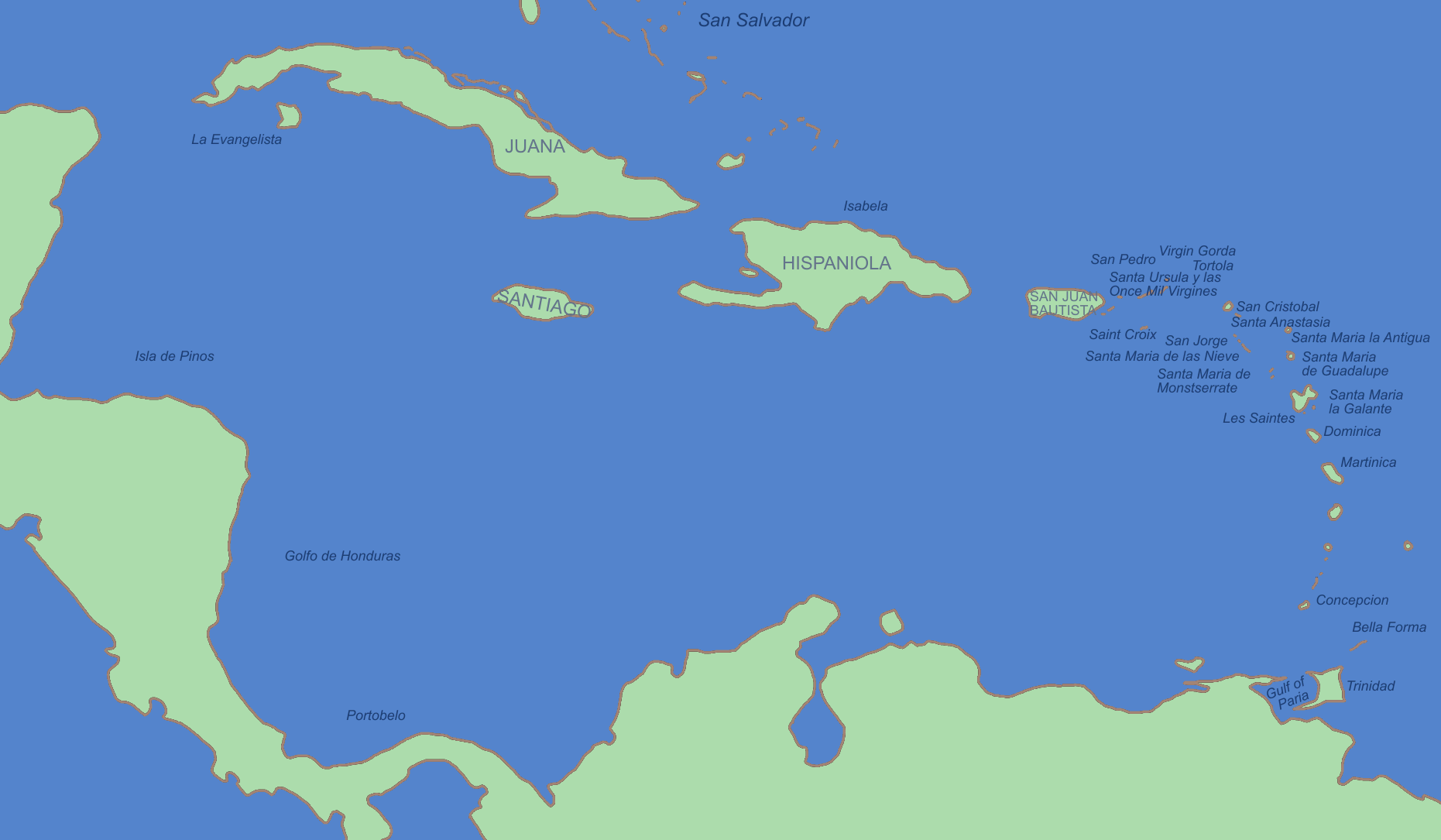
The mostly Spanish-controlled Caribbean in the 16th century

All islands at some point were, and a few still are, colonies of European nations; a few are overseas or dependent territories:

- British West Indies/Anglophone Caribbean – Anguilla, Antigua and Barbuda, The Bahamas, Barbados, Bay Islands, Guyana, Belize, British Virgin Islands, Cayman Islands, Dominica, Grenada, Jamaica, Montserrat, Saint Croix (briefly), Saint Kitts and Nevis, Saint Lucia, Saint Vincent and the Grenadines, Suriname (until 1667), Trinidad and Tobago (from 1797) and the Turks and Caicos Islands
- Danish West Indies – Possession of Denmark-Norway before 1814, then Denmark, present-day United States Virgin Islands
- Dutch West Indies – Aruba, Bonaire, Curaçao, Saba, Sint Eustatius, Sint Maarten, Suriname, Bay Islands (briefly), Saint Croix (briefly), Tobago, and Virgin Islands
- French West Indies – Anguilla (briefly), Antigua and Barbuda (briefly), Dominica, Dominican Republic (briefly), Grenada, Haiti (formerly Saint-Domingue), Montserrat (briefly), Saint Lucia, Saint Vincent and the Grenadines, Sint Eustatius (briefly), Sint Maarten, St. Kitts (briefly), Tobago (briefly), Saint Croix, the current French overseas départements of French Guiana, Martinique and Guadeloupe (including Marie-Galante, La Désirade and Les Saintes), the current French overseas collectivities of Saint Barthélemy and Saint Martin
- Portuguese West Indies – present-day Barbados, known as Os Barbados in the 16th century when the Portuguese claimed the island en route to Brazil. The Portuguese left Barbados abandoned years before the British arrived.
- Spanish West Indies – Cuba, Hispaniola (present-day Dominican Republic), Martinica (until 1635 to France), Haiti (until 1659, lost to France), Puerto Rico, Jamaica (until 1655, lost to Great Britain), the Cayman Islands (until 1670 to Great Britain) Trinidad (until 1797, lost to Great Britain) and Bay Islands (until 1643, lost to Great Britain), coastal islands of Central America (except Belize), and some Caribbean coastal islands of Panama, Colombia, Mexico, and Venezuela.
- Swedish West Indies – present-day French Saint-Barthélemy, Guadeloupe (briefly) and Tobago (briefly).
- Courlander West Indies – Tobago (until 1691)

The British West Indies were united by the United Kingdom into a West Indies Federation between 1958 and 1962. The independent countries formerly part of the B.W.I. still have a joint cricket team that competes in Test matches, One Day Internationals and Twenty20 Internationals. The West Indian cricket team includes the South American nation of Guyana, the only former British colony on the mainland of that continent.

In addition, these countries share the University of the West Indies as a regional entity. The university consists of three main campuses in Jamaica, Barbados and Trinidad and Tobago, a smaller campus in The Bahamas and Resident Tutors in other contributing territories such as Trinidad.

=== Continental countries with Caribbean coastlines and islands ===
- Belize
  - Ambergris Caye
  - Caye Caulker
  - Glover's Reef
  - Hick's Cayes
  - Lighthouse Reef
  - St. George's Caye
  - Tobacco Caye
  - Turneffe Atoll
- Colombia
  - Archipelago of San Andrés, Providencia and Santa Catalina
    - Bajo Nuevo Bank
    - Crab Cay
    - Quita Sueño Bank
    - Roncador Bank
    - Roncador Cay
    - San Andrés (island)
    - Santa Catalina Island (Colombia)
    - Serrana Bank
    - Serranilla Bank
  - Rosario Islands
- Costa Rica
  - Brava Island, Costa Rica
  - Isla Calero
  - Uvita Island
- Guatemala
  - Izabal
    - Livingston
    - Puerto Barrios
- Honduras
  - Islas de la Bahía
    - Cayos Cochinos
    - Guanaja
    - Roatán
    - Swan Islands
    - Útila
    - Cayos Cochinos
    - Cayo Gorda
  - Bobel Cay
- Nicaragua
  - Corn Islands
  - Miskito Cays
  - Pearl Cays
    - Calala Island
  - Rama Cay
- Panama
  - Archipelago off Guna Yala coast (including the San Blas Islands)
  - Bocas del Toro Archipelago (approximately 300 islands)
  - Galeta Island (Panama)
  - Isla Grande
  - Soledad Miria
    - Cayos Limones
- Mexico
  - Quintana Roo
    - Banco Chinchorro
    - Cozumel
    - Isla Blanca
    - Isla Contoy
    - Isla Holbox
    - Isla Mujeres
- Venezuela
  - Blanquilla Island
  - Coche Island
  - Cubagua Island
  - Isla Aves
  - Islas Los Frailes
  - Isla Margarita
  - La Orchila
  - La Sola Island
  - La Tortuga Island
  - Las Aves archipelago
  - Los Hermanos Archipelago
  - Los Monjes Archipelago
  - Los Roques archipelago
  - Los Testigos Islands
  - Patos Island

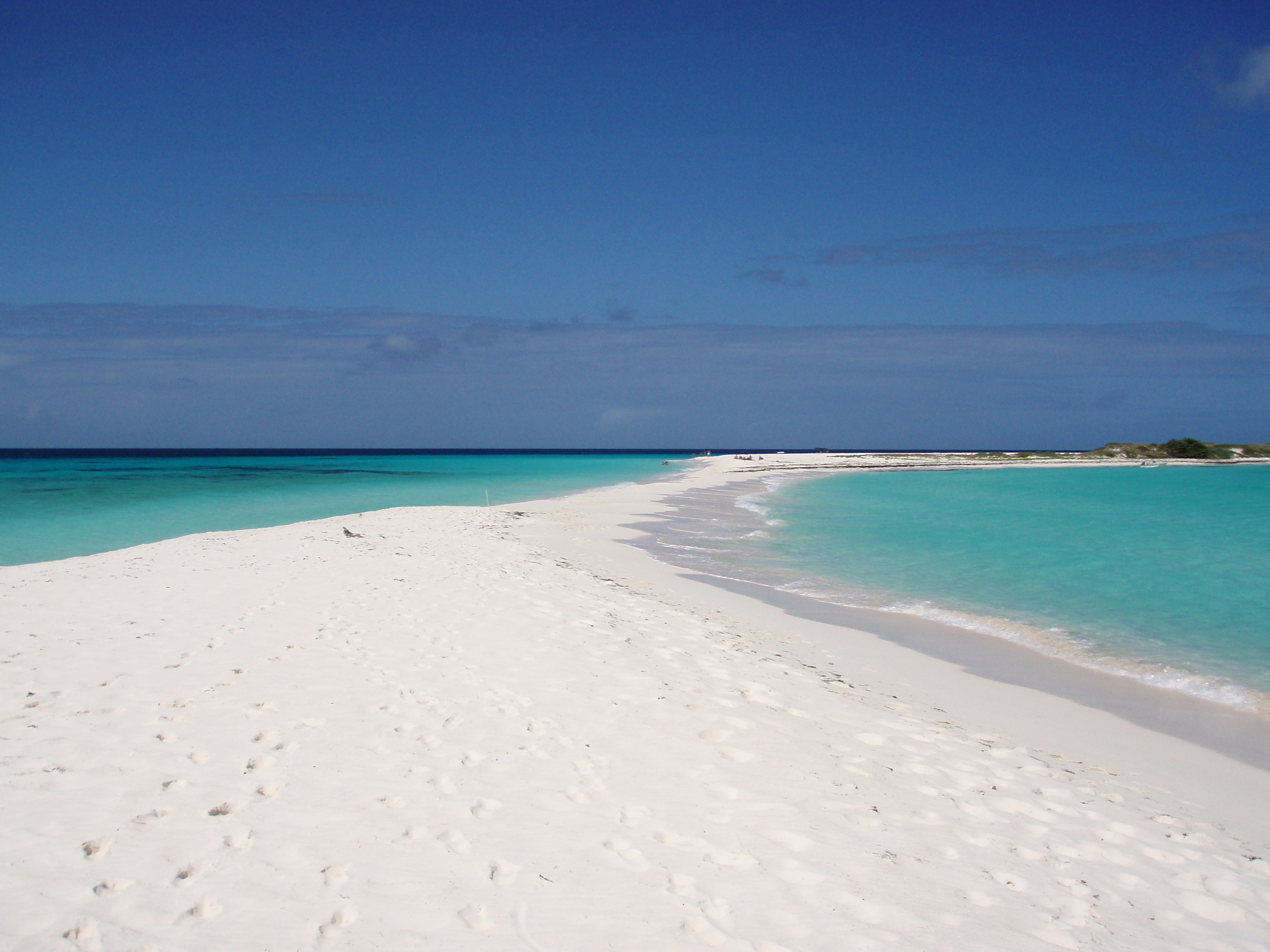
Cayo de Agua, Los Roques Archipelago, Venezuela

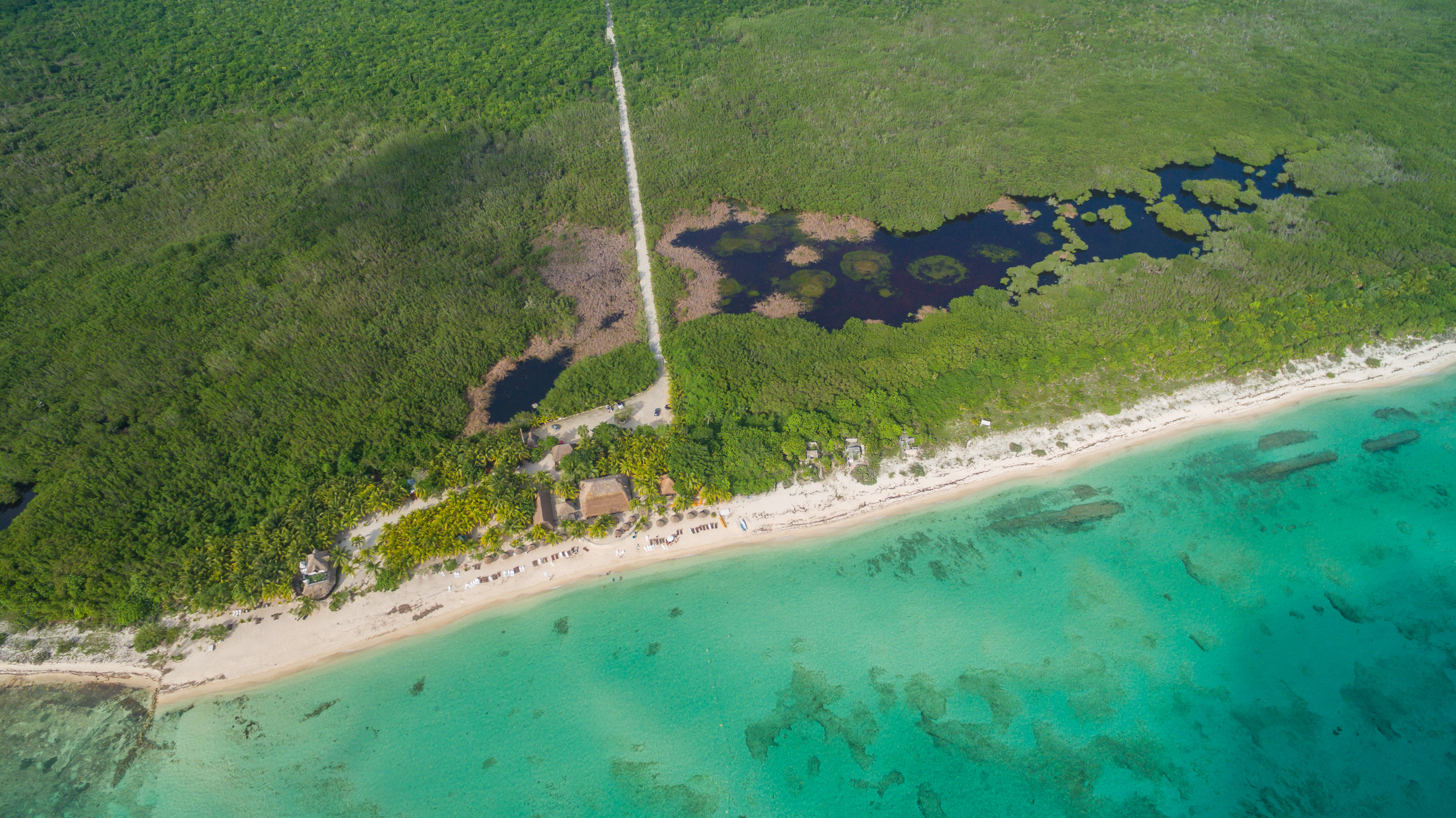
Palancar Beach in Cozumel Island, Mexico

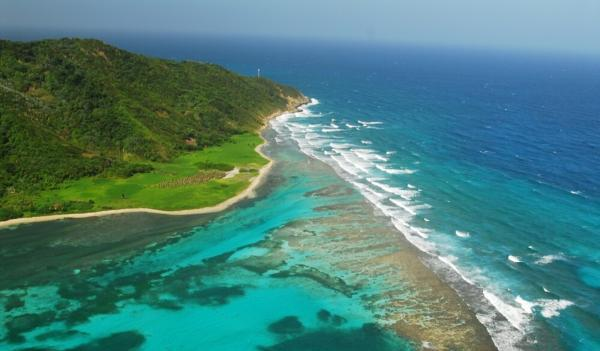
Guanaja Island, Bay Islands, Honduras

=== Biodiversity ===
The Caribbean islands have one of the world's most diverse ecosystems. The animals, fungi, and plants are Conservation International biodiversity hotspots because of their exceptionally diverse terrestrial and marine ecosystems, ranging from montane cloud forests to tropical rainforest to cactus scrublands. In the Caribbean, the area of forest increased by 55,500 hectares per year in 1990–2000, 64,200 ha per year in 2000–2015 and 14,200 ha per year in 2015–2025.

The region also contains about 8% (by surface area) of the world's coral reefs along with extensive seagrass meadows, often found in the shallow marine waters bordering the region's island and continental coasts.

For the fungi, there is a checklist based on nearly 90,000 records derived from specimens in reference collections, published accounts, and field observations. It includes more than 11,250 species of fungi recorded in the region. The checklist is not exhaustive, and it is likely that the true number of fungal species already known in the Caribbean is higher. The number of fungal species in the Caribbean, including species not yet recorded, is likely far higher, given the generally accepted estimate that only about 7% of all fungi worldwide have been discovered. Estimates have been made for endemic fungal species on some Caribbean islands. For Cuba, 2,200 species of fungi have been tentatively identified as possible endemics of the island; for Puerto Rico, the number is 789; for the Dominican Republic, 699; for Trinidad and Tobago, 407.

Many ecosystems in the Caribbean islands have been affected by deforestation, pollution, and human encroachment. The arrival of the first humans is correlated with extinction of giant owls and dwarf ground sloths. The hotspot contains dozens of highly threatened animals (birds, mammals, and reptiles), fungi, and plants. The threatened animals include the Puerto Rican amazon, two species of solenodon (giant shrews) in Cuba and Hispaniola, and the Cuban crocodile.

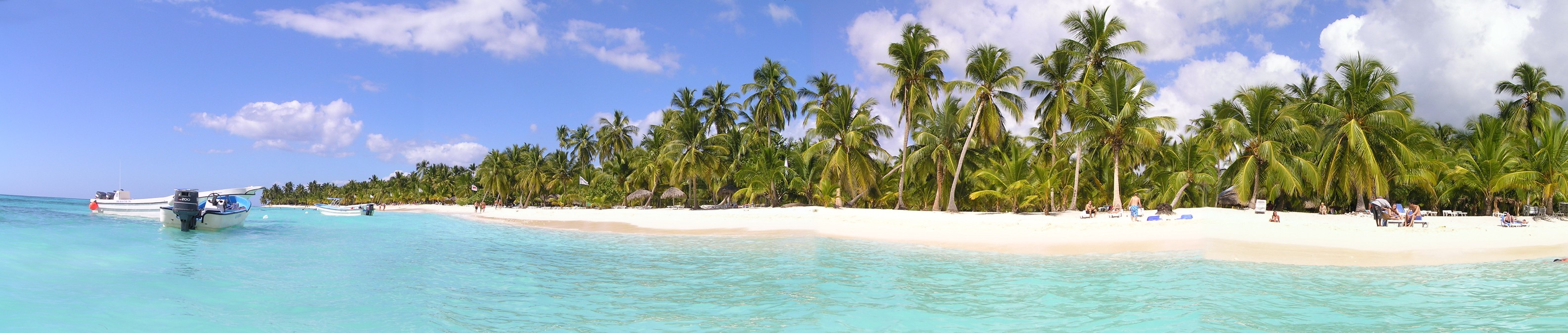
Saona Island, Dominican Republic

The region's coral reefs, which contain about 70 species of hard corals and 500 to 700 species of reef-associated fishes, have undergone rapid decline in ecosystem integrity and are considered vulnerable to global warming and ocean acidification. According to a UNEP report, the Caribbean coral reefs might go extinct in next 20 years due to human population explosion along the coastlines, overfishing, pollution of coastal areas, and global warming.

Some Caribbean islands have terrain that Europeans found suitable for cultivation for agriculture. Tobacco was an important early crop during the colonial era, but was eventually overtaken by sugarcane production as the region's staple crop. Sugar was produced from sugarcane for export to Europe. Cuba and Barbados were historically the largest producers of sugar. The tropical plantation system came to dominate Caribbean settlement. Other islands were found to have terrain unsuited for agriculture, for example Dominica, which remains heavily forested. The islands in the southern Lesser Antilles, Aruba, Bonaire and Curaçao, are extremely arid, making them unsuitable for agriculture, but they have salt pans that were exploited by the Dutch. Sea water was pumped into shallow ponds, producing coarse salt when the water evaporated.

The natural environmental diversity of the Caribbean islands has led to recent growth in eco-tourism. This type of tourism is growing on islands lacking sandy beaches and dense human populations.

=== Plants and animals ===
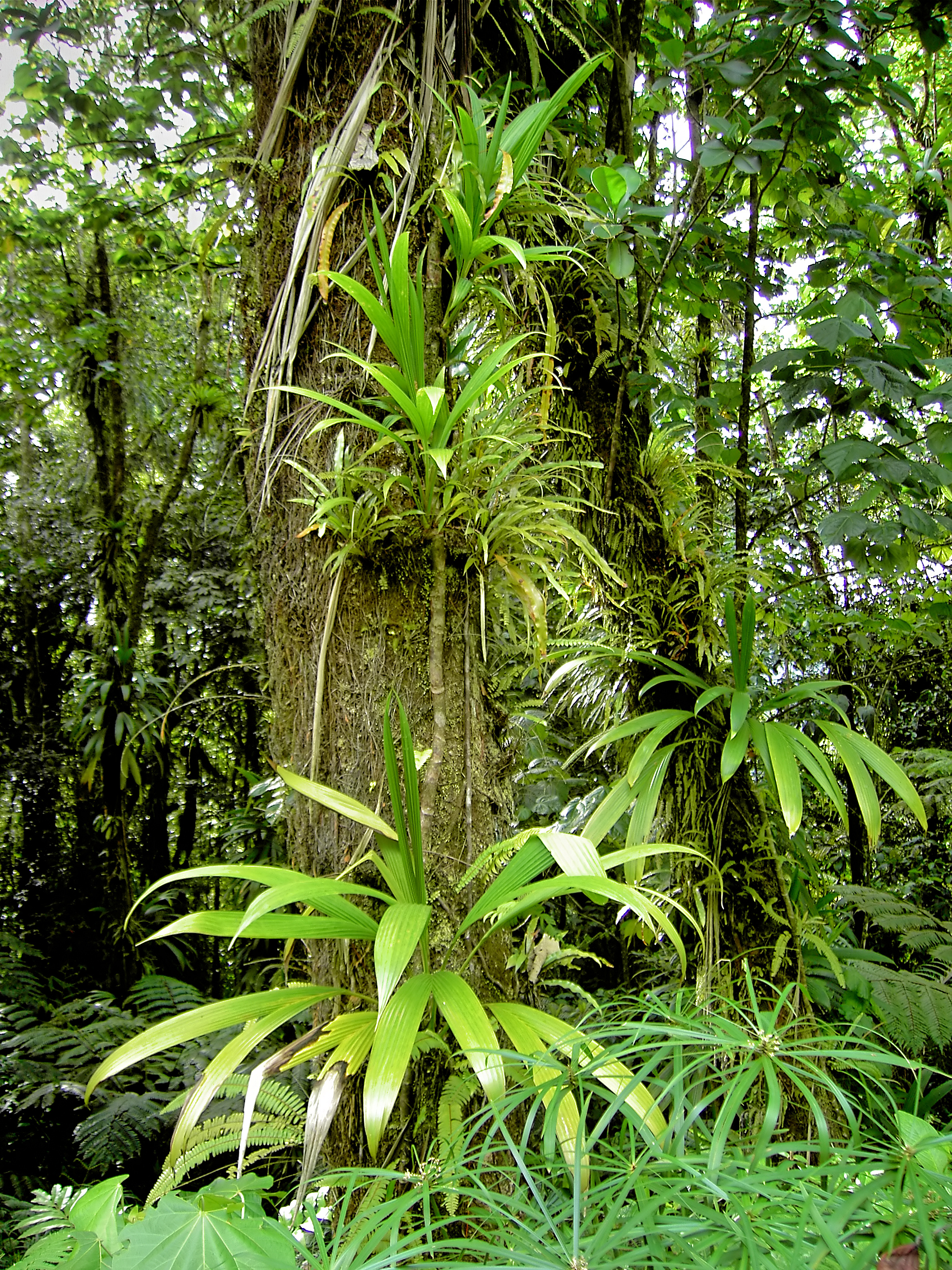
Epiphytes (bromeliads, climbing palms) in the rainforest of Dominica

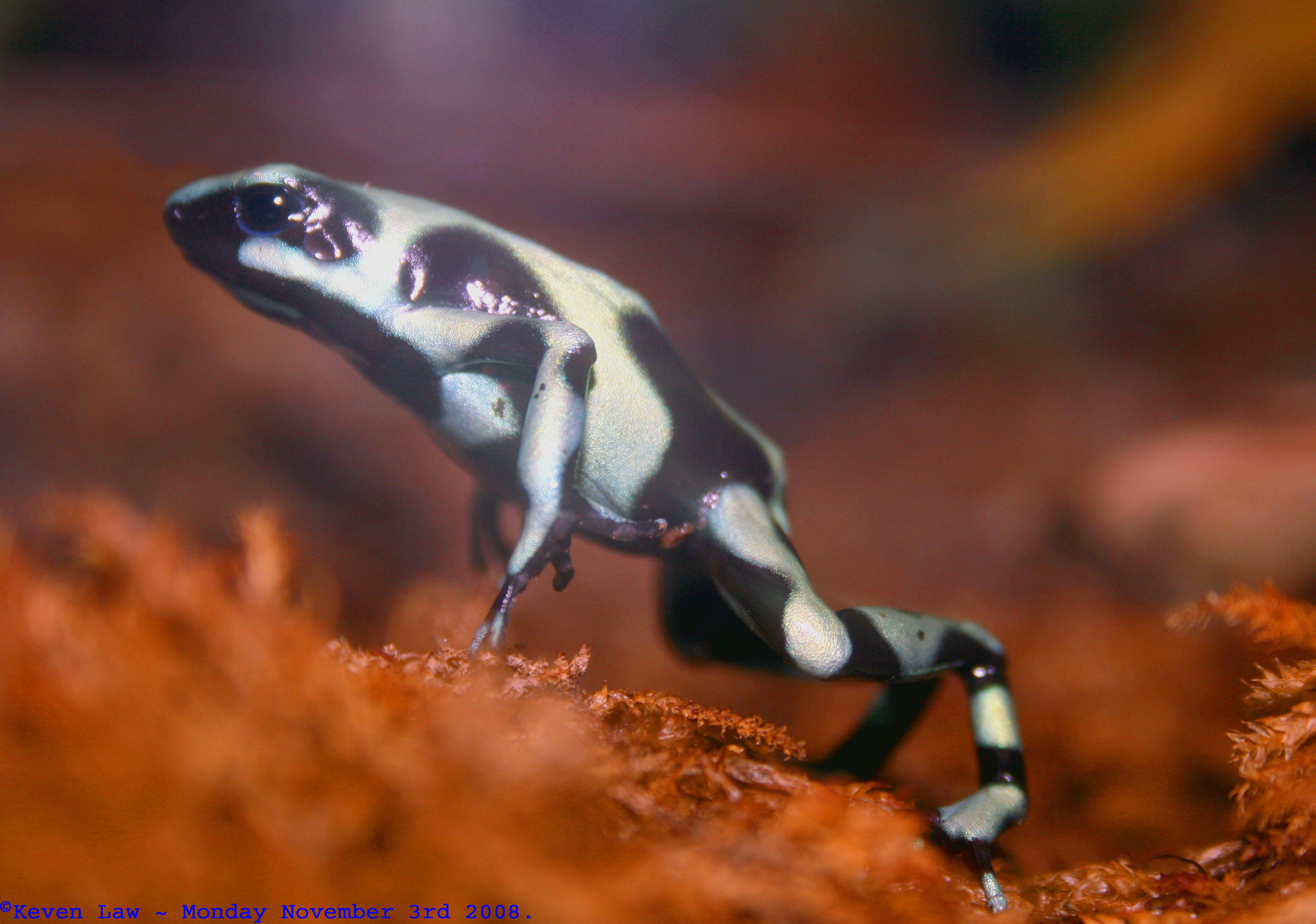
A green and black poison frog, Dendrobates auratus

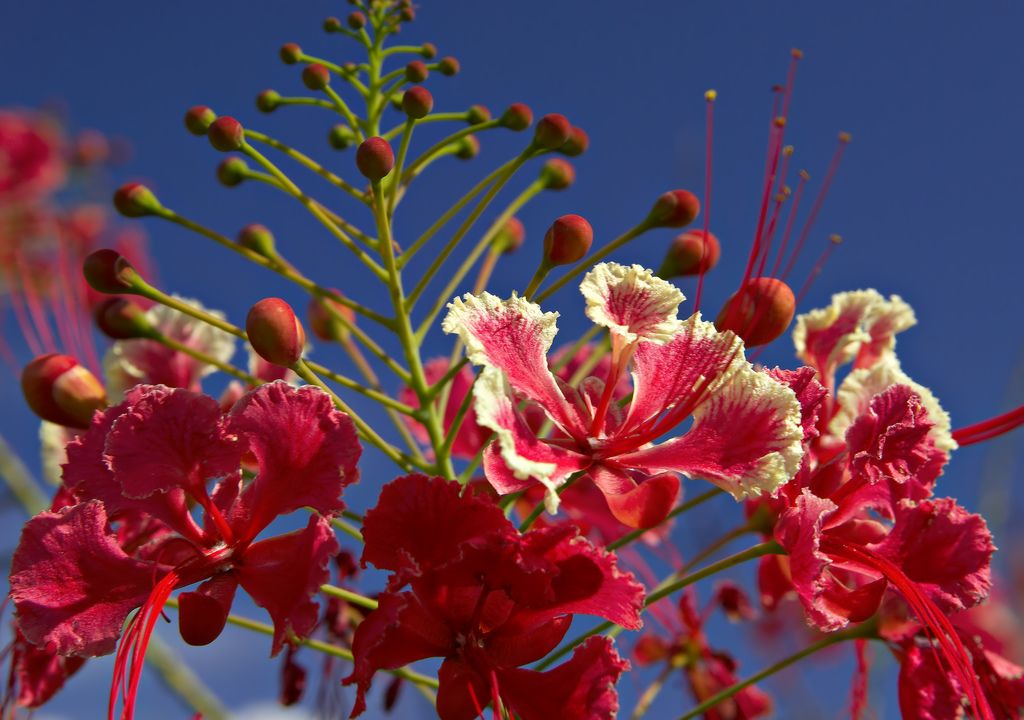
Caesalpinia pulcherrima, Guadeloupe

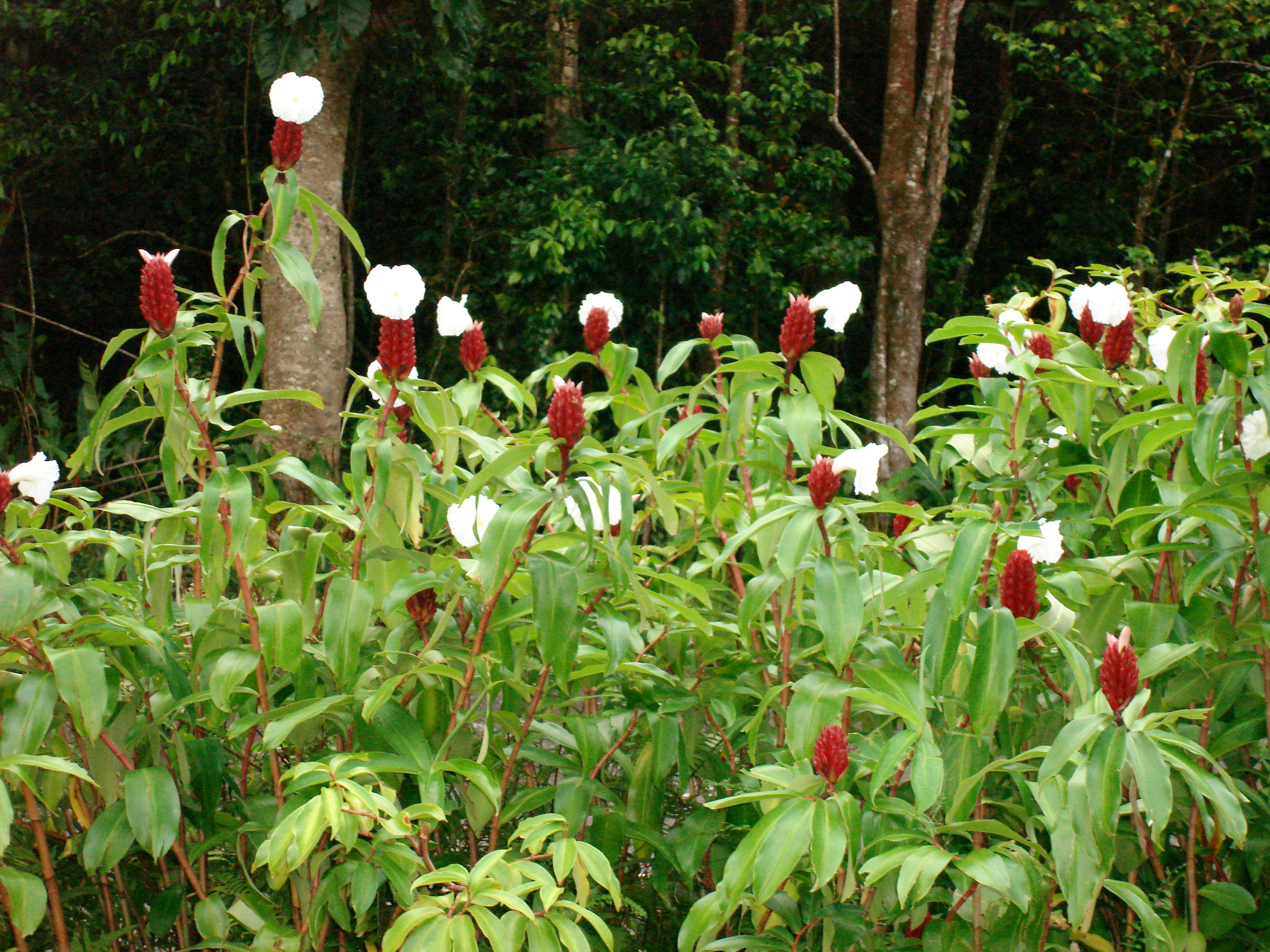
Costus speciosus, a marsh plant, Guadeloupe

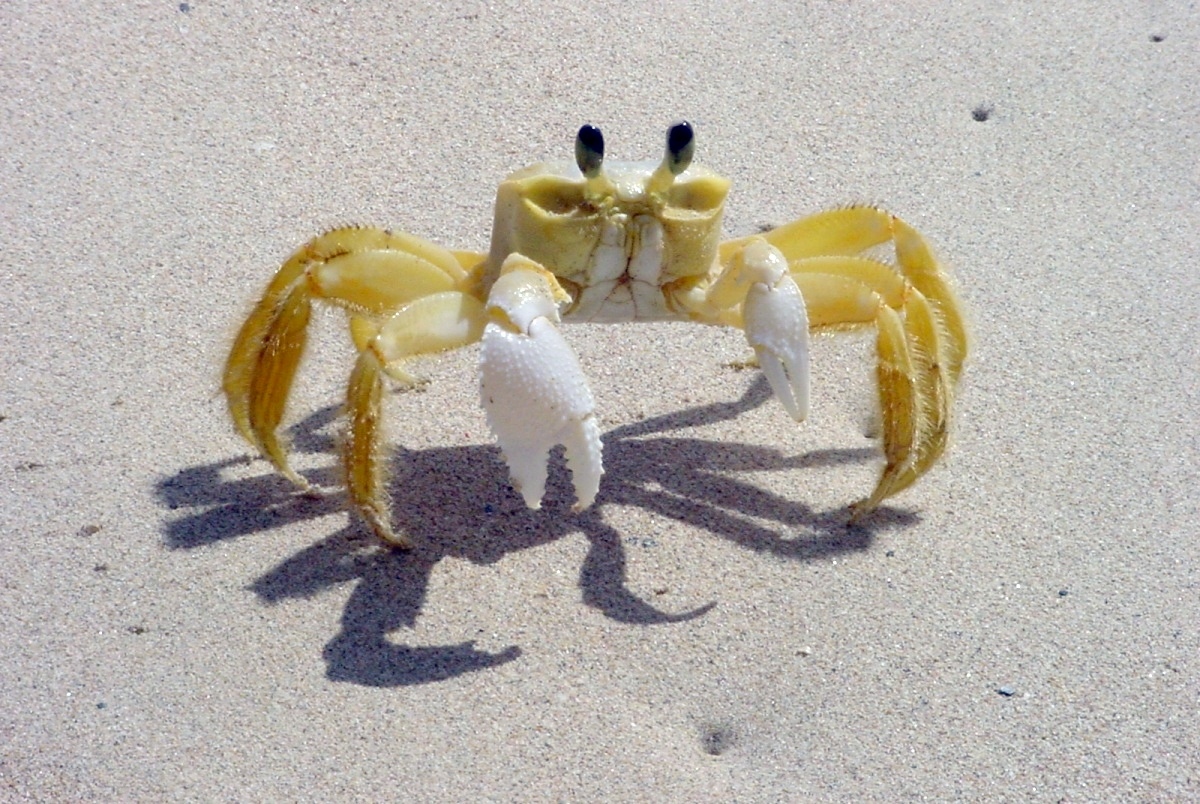
An Atlantic ghost crab (Ocypode quadrata) in Martinique

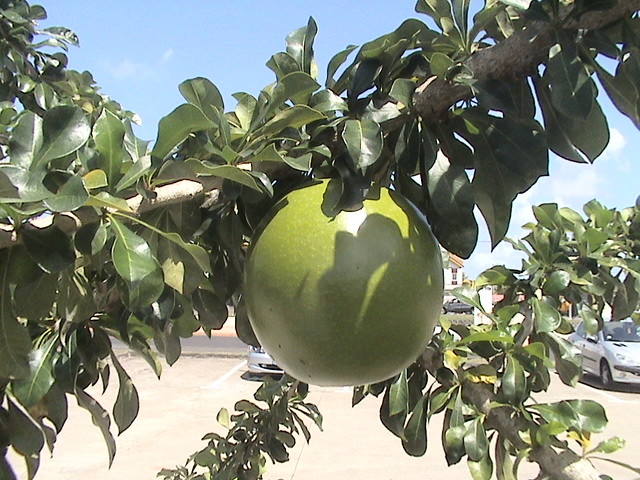
Crescentia cujete, or calabash fruit, Martinique

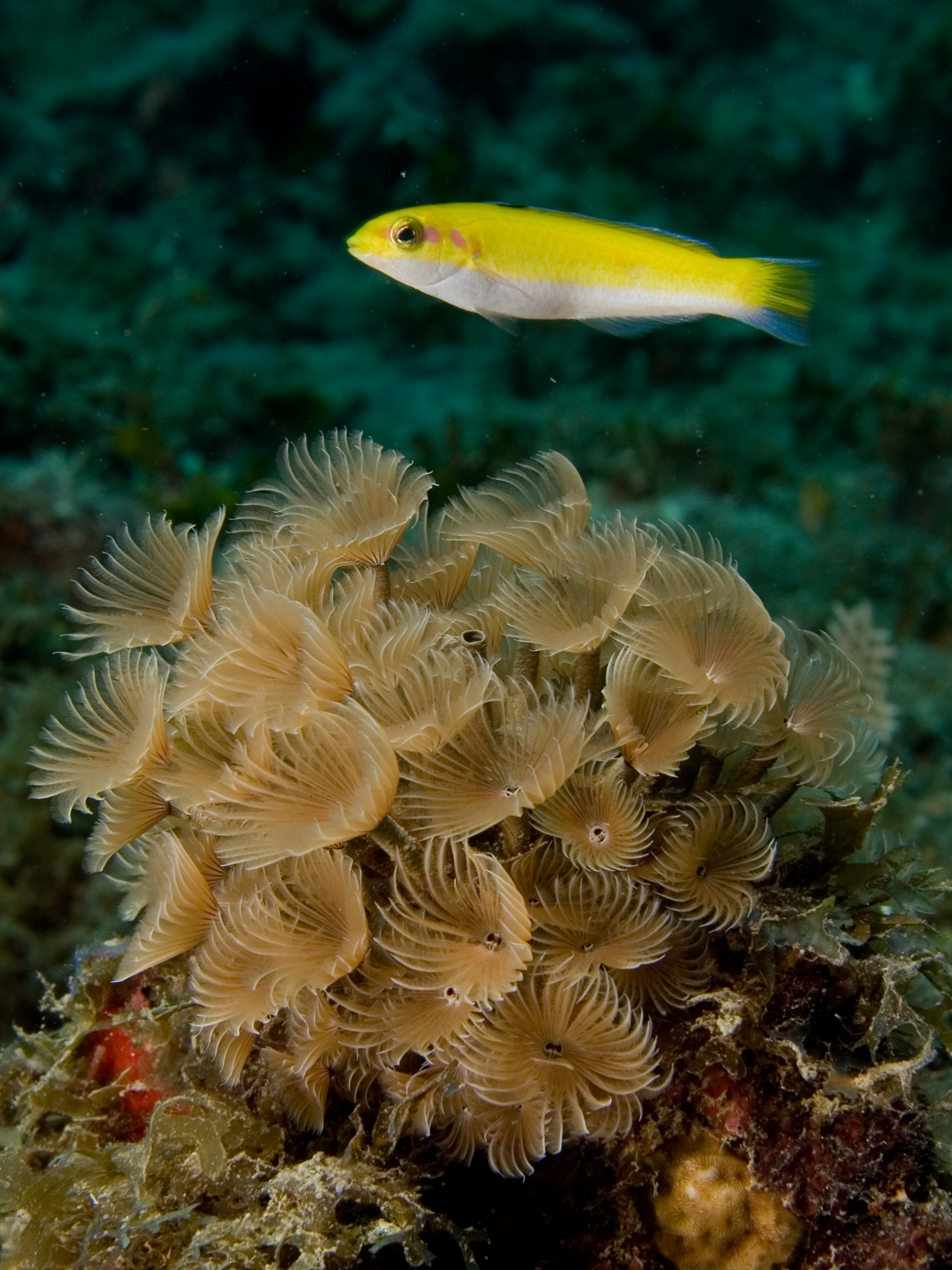
Thalassoma bifasciatum (bluehead wrasse fish), over Bispira brunnea (social feather duster worms)

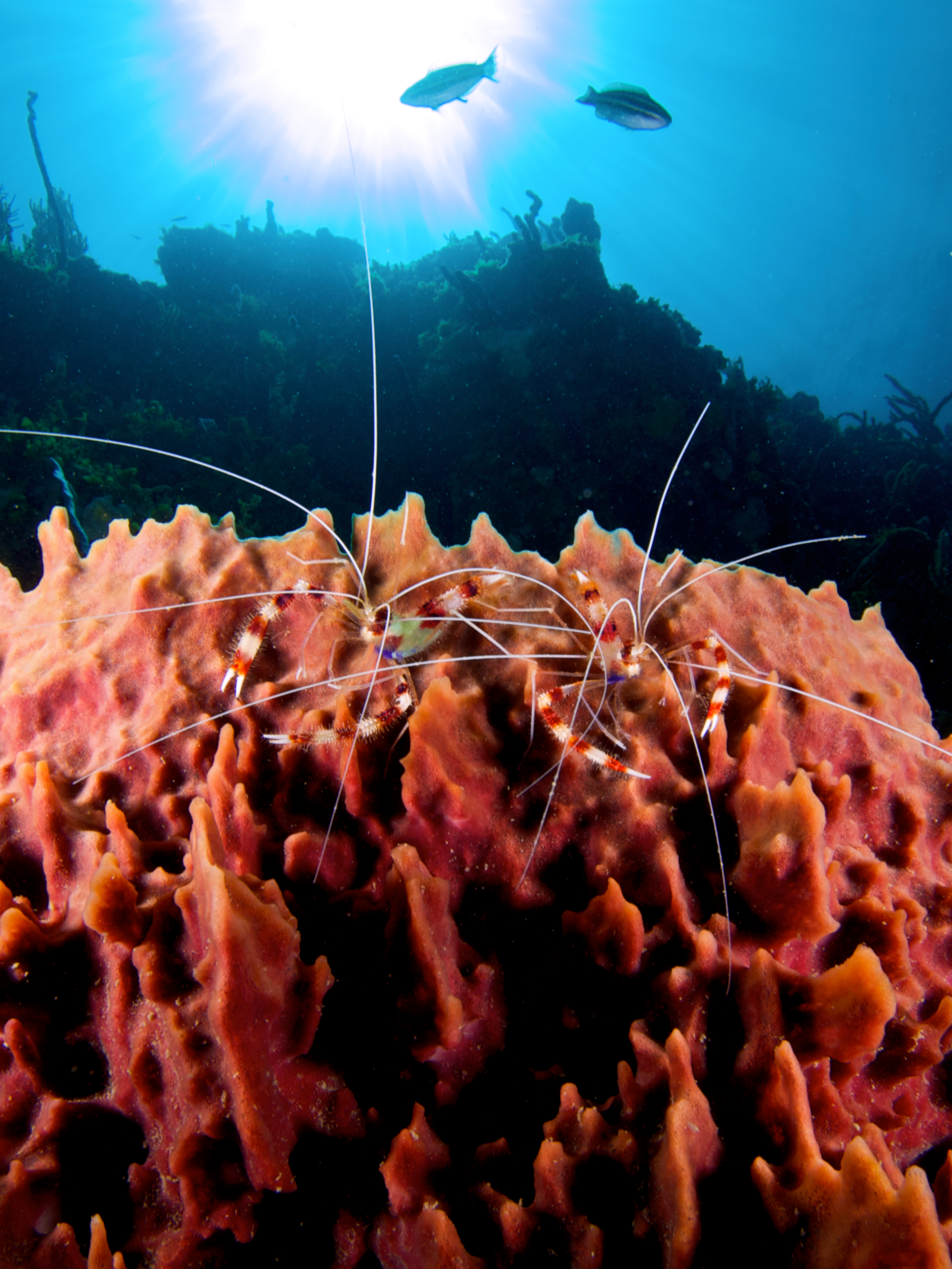
Two Stenopus hispidus (banded cleaner shrimp) on a Xestospongia muta (giant barrel sponge)

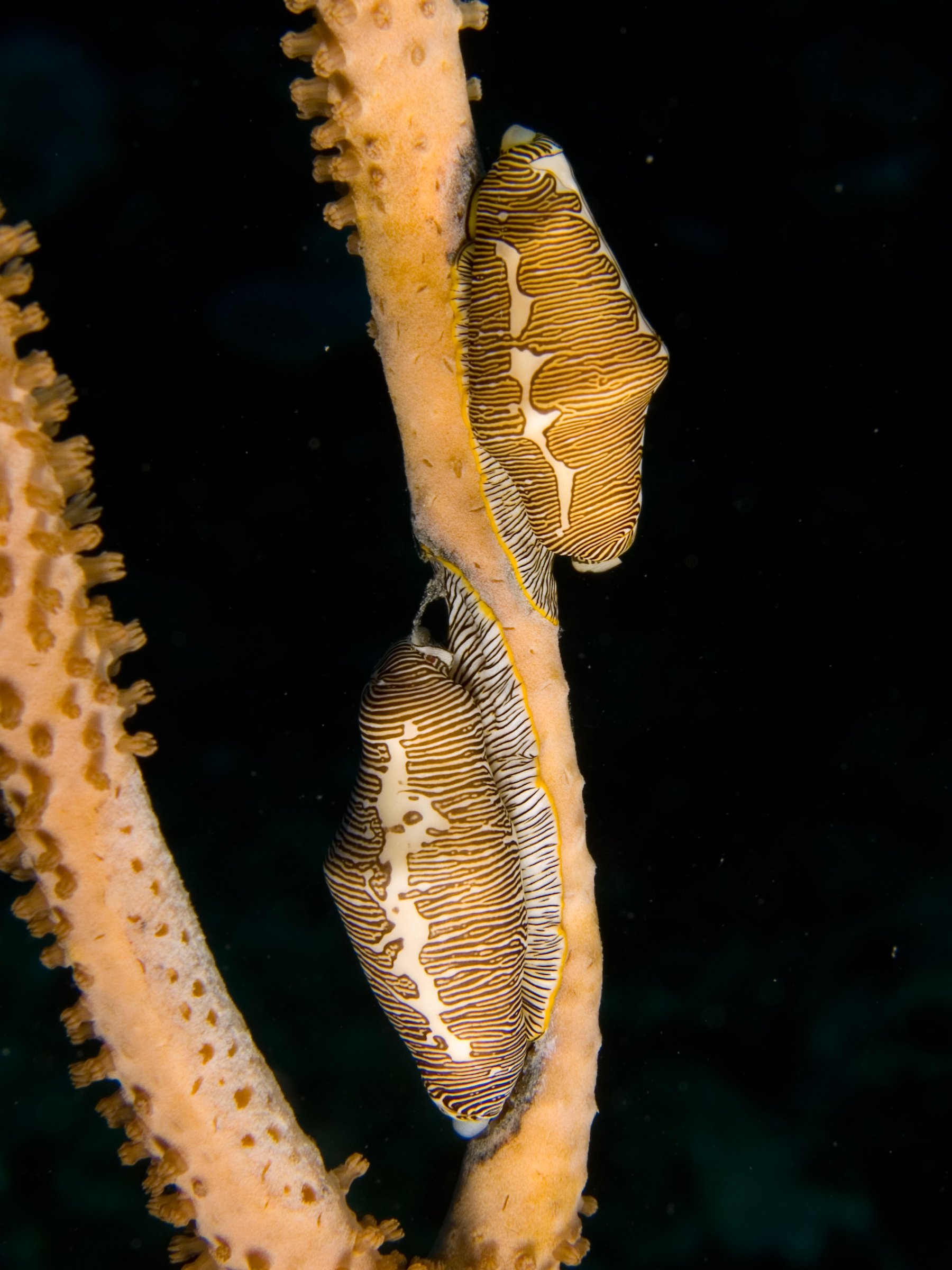
A pair of Cyphoma signatum (fingerprint cowry), off coastal Haiti

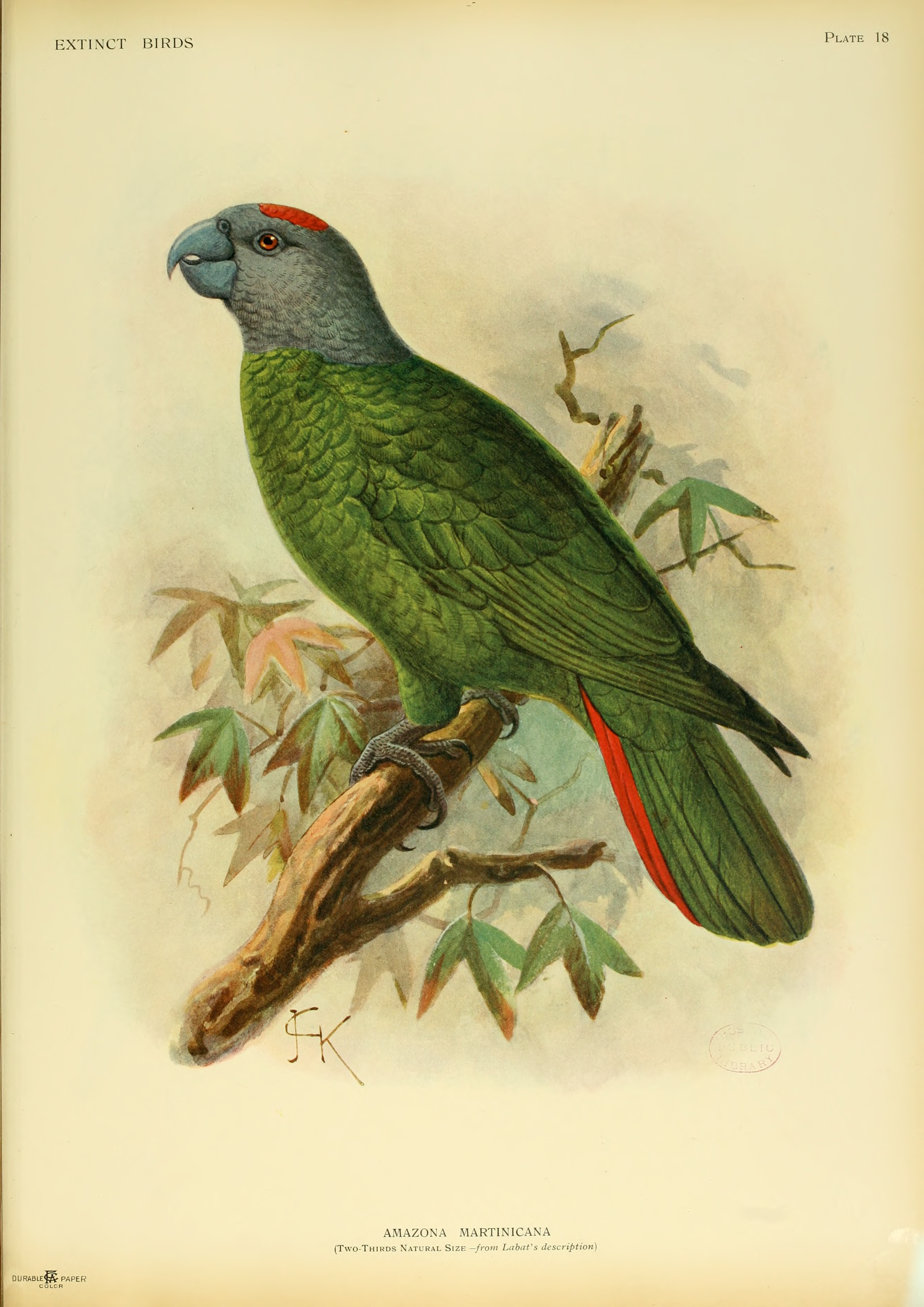
The Martinique amazon (Amazona martinicana), an extinct species of parrot in the family Psittacidae

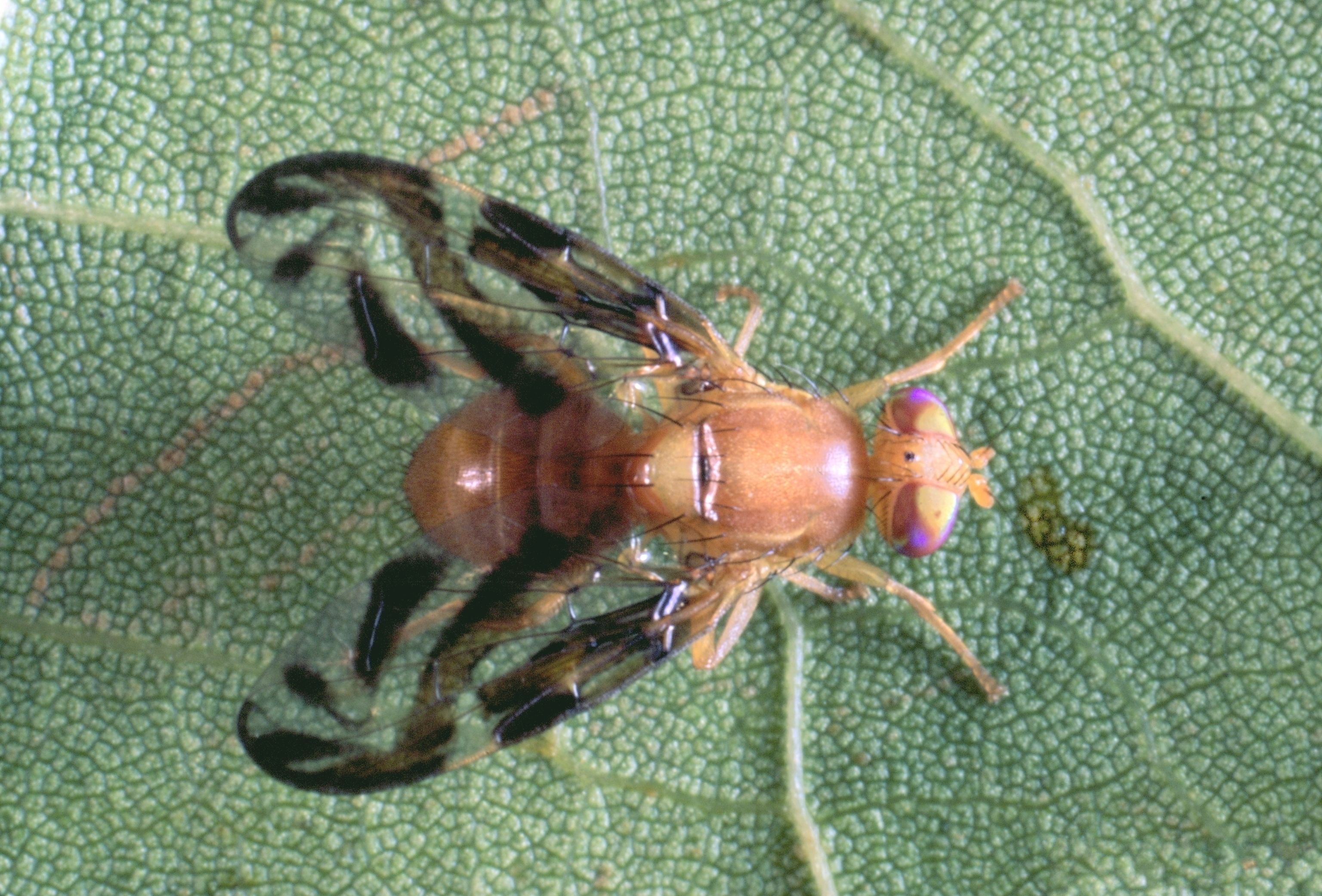
Anastrepha suspensa, a Caribbean fruit fly

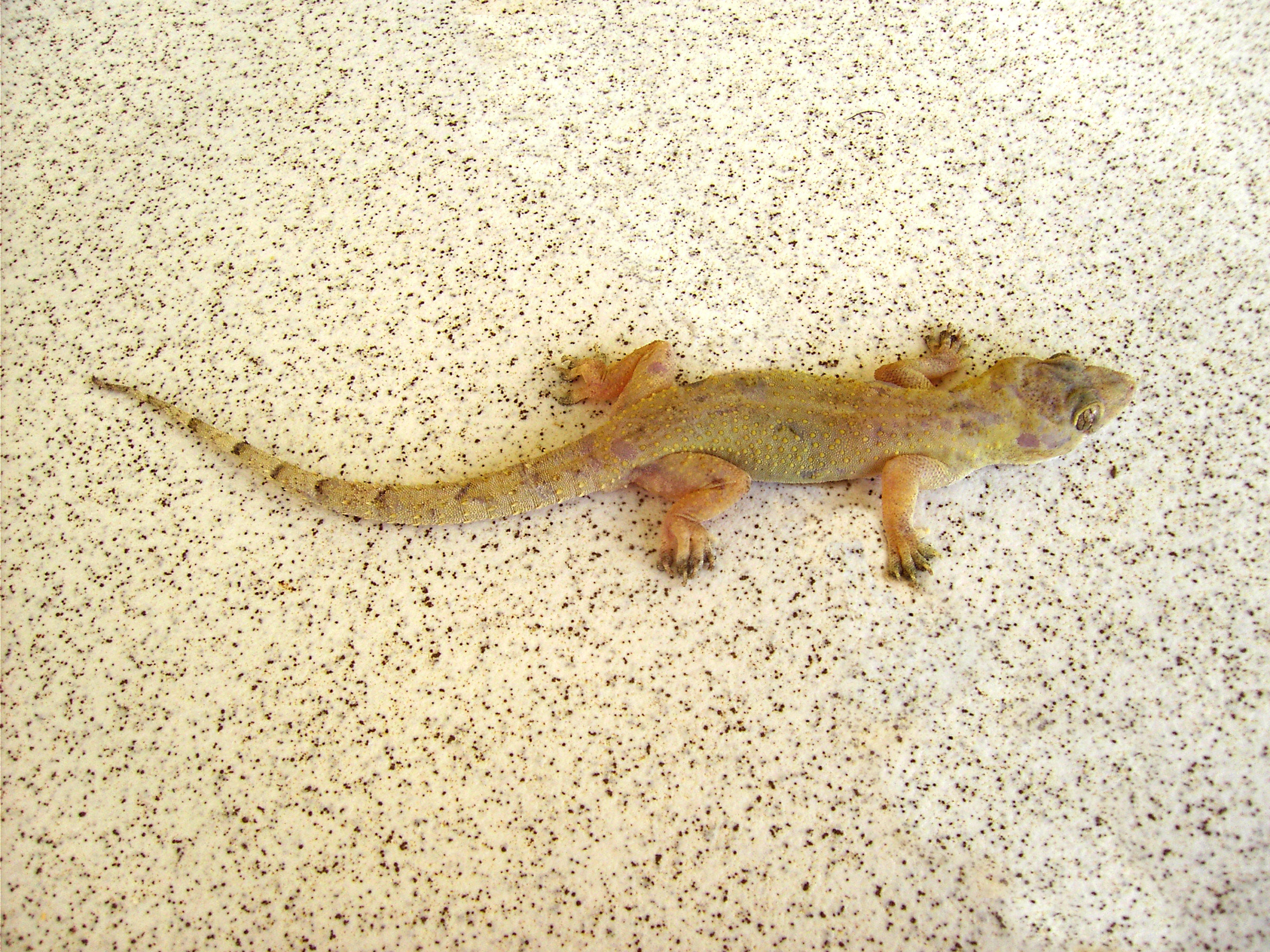
Hemidactylus mabouia, a tropical gecko in Dominica

== Politics ==
=== Regionalism ===
Flag of the Caribbean Common Market and Community (CARICOM)

Caribbean societies are very different from other Western societies in terms of size, culture, and degree of mobility of their citizens. The current economic and political problems the states face individually are common to all Caribbean states. Regional development has contributed to attempts to subdue current problems and avoid projected problems. From a political and economic perspective, regionalism serves to make Caribbean states active participants in current international affairs through collective coalitions. In 1973, the first political regionalism in the Caribbean Basin was created by advances of the English-speaking Caribbean nations through the institution known as the Caribbean Common Market and Community (CARICOM), in Guyana.

Certain scholars have argued both for and against generalizing the political structures of the Caribbean. On the one hand the Caribbean states are politically diverse, ranging from socialist systems toward more capitalist Westminster-style parliamentary systems. Other scholars argue that these differences are superficial, and that they tend to undermine commonalities in the various Caribbean states. Contemporary Caribbean systems seem to reflect a "blending of traditional and modern patterns, yielding hybrid systems that exhibit significant structural variations and divergent constitutional traditions yet ultimately appear to function in similar ways". The political systems of the Caribbean states share similar practices.

The influence of regionalism in the Caribbean is often marginalized. Some scholars believe that regionalism cannot exist in the Caribbean because each small state is unique. On the other hand, scholars also suggest that there are commonalities amongst the Caribbean nations that suggest regionalism exists. "Proximity as well as historical ties among the Caribbean nations has led to cooperation as well as a desire for collective action". These attempts at regionalization reflect the nations' desires to compete in the international economic system.

Furthermore, a lack of interest from other major states promoted regionalism in the region. In recent years, the Caribbean has suffered from a lack of U.S. interest. "With the end of the Cold War, U.S. security and economic interests have been focused on other areas. As a result there has been a significant reduction in U.S. aid and investment to the Caribbean." The lack of international support for these small, relatively poor states, helped regionalism prosper.

Following the Cold War another issue of importance in the Caribbean has been the reduced economic growth of some Caribbean States due to the United States and European Union's allegations of special treatment toward the region by each other.

==== United States–European Union trade dispute ====
The Lomé Convention, which allowed banana exports from the former colonies of the Group of African, Caribbean and Pacific states (ACP) to enter Europe cheaply, came into effect in 1976. In 1999, the United States under President Bill Clinton launched a challenge in the World Trade Organization against the European Union over its preferential program. The World Trade Organization sided in the United States' favour and the beneficial elements of the convention to African, Caribbean and Pacific states have been partially dismantled and replaced by the Cotonou Agreement.

During the US/EU dispute, the United States threatened to impose large tariffs on European Union goods (up to 100%) to pressure Europe to change the agreement with the Caribbean nations in favour of the Cotonou Agreement.

Farmers in the Caribbean have complained of falling profits and rising costs as the Lomé Convention weakens. Some farmers have faced increased pressure to turn toward the cultivation of illegal drugs, which has a higher profit margin and fills the sizable demand for these illegal drugs in North America and Europe.

==== African Union relations ====
Many Caribbean nations have sought to deepen ties with the continent of Africa. The African Union-bloc has referred to the Caribbean as the potential "Sixth Region" of the African Union. Some Caribbean states have already moved to join Africa institutions including Barbados, Grenada, Guyana, and The Bahamas, which have all become members of the African Export Import Bank. And the Caribbean Development Bank signing a cooperation strategic partnership agreement with the African Development Bank (AfDB) At present Antigua and Barbuda, Barbados, Jamaica, Guyana, and Suriname are at various stages of establishing direct air flights with Africa to boost person-to-person links and boost trade between both regions.

The first inter-regional Africa-Caribbean Community (CARICOM) Summit took place in September 2021. In August 2023 the African Union's African Export–Import Bank officially opened its first Caribbean Community office in Barbados beginning the process of integrating willing Caribbean states as the 6th region of the African Union.AFREXIMBANK opens Caribbean office in Barbados

==== Caribbean Financial Action Task Force and Association of Caribbean States ====
Caribbean nations have also started to more closely cooperate in the Caribbean Financial Action Task Force and other instruments to add oversight of the offshore industry. One of the most important associations that deal with regionalism amongst the nations of the Caribbean Basin has been the Association of Caribbean States (ACS). Proposed by CARICOM in 1992, the ACS soon won the support of the other countries of the region. It was founded in July 1994. The ACS maintains regionalism within the Caribbean on issues unique to the Caribbean Basin. Through coalition building, like the ACS and CARICOM, regionalism has become an undeniable part of the politics and economics of the Caribbean. The successes of region-building initiatives are still debated by scholars, yet regionalism remains prevalent throughout the Caribbean.

==== Bolivarian Alliance ====
The President of Venezuela, Hugo Chavez launched an economic group called the Bolivarian Alliance for the Americas (ALBA), which several eastern Caribbean islands joined.

== List of countries and territories ==
| Flag | Country or territory | Sovereignty | Status | Area (km^{2}) | Population (2021 est.) | Density (people per km^{2}) | Capital |
|---|---|---|---|---|---|---|---|
| (Anguilla) | Anguilla | United Kingdom | Overseas territory | 91 | 15,753 | 164.8 | The Valley |
| (Antigua and Barbuda) | Antigua and Barbuda | Independent | Constitutional monarchy | 442 | 93,219 | 199.1 | St. John's |
| (Aruba) | Aruba | Kingdom of the Netherlands | Constituent kingdom | 180 | 106,537 | 594.4 | Oranjestad |
| (The Bahamas) | The Bahamas | Independent | Constitutional monarchy | 13,943 | 407,906 | 24.5 | Nassau |
| (Barbados) | Barbados | Independent | Republic | 430 | 287,025 | 595.3 | Bridgetown |
| (Honduras) | Bay Islands Department | Honduras | Department | 229 | 110,000 | 480 | Coxen Hole |
| (Belize) | Coastal areas of Belize | Independent | Constitutional monarchy | 22,966 | 400,031 | 17.79 | Belmopan |
| (Bermuda) | Bermuda (Note: Bermuda is an associate member of the Caribbean Community.) | United Kingdom | Overseas territory | 53.2 | 63,913 (Note: 2019 estimate) | 1,338 | Hamilton |
| (Bonaire) | Bonaire | Kingdom of the Netherlands | Special Municipality | 294 | 20,104 | 41.1 | Kralendijk |
| (British Virgin Islands) | British Virgin Islands | United Kingdom | Overseas territory | 151 | 31,122 | 152.3 | Road Town |
| (Cayman Islands) | Cayman Islands | United Kingdom | Overseas territory | 264 | 68,136 | 212.1 | George Town |
| (Colombia) | Caribbean coastal areas of Colombia | Independent | Republic | 1,141,748 | 51,516,562 | 46.15 | Bogotá |
| (Cuba) | Cuba | Independent | Republic | 109,886 | 11,256,372 | 102.0 | Havana |
| (Curaçao) | Curaçao | Kingdom of the Netherlands | Constituent kingdom | 444 | 190,338 | 317.1 | Willemstad |
| (Dominica) | Dominica | Independent | Republic | 751 | 72,412 | 89.2 | Roseau |
| (Dominican Republic) | Dominican Republic | Independent | Republic | 48,671 | 11,117,873 | 207.3 | Santo Domingo |
| (Federal Dependencies of Venezuela) | Federal Dependencies of Venezuela | Venezuela | Dependency | 342 | 2,155 | 6.3 | Gran Roque |
| (French Guiana) | Coastal areas of French Guiana | France | Overseas department | 83,846 | 297,449 | 3.6 | Cayenne |
| (Grenada) | Grenada | Independent | Constitutional monarchy | 344 | 124,610 | 302.3 | St. George's |
| (Guadeloupe) | Guadeloupe | France | Overseas department | 1,628 | 396,051 | 246.7 | Basse-Terre |
| (Guyana) | Coastal areas of Guyana | Independent | Republic | 214,970 | 804,567 | 3.502 | Georgetown |
| (Haiti) | Haiti | Independent | Republic | 27,750 | 11,447,569 | 361.5 | Port-au-Prince |
| (Jamaica) | Jamaica | Independent | Constitutional monarchy | 10,991 | 2,827,695 | 247.4 | Kingston |
| (Costa Rica) | Limón Province | Costa Rica | Republic | 9,176.96 | 469,797 | 51.19 | Limón |
| (Martinique) | Martinique | France | Overseas department | 1,128 | 368,796 | 352.6 | Fort-de-France |
| (Montserrat) | Montserrat | United Kingdom | Overseas territory | 102 | 4,417 | 58.8 | Plymouth (Brades) |
| | Navassa Island | United States/Haiti | Territory (uninhabited) | 5 | 0 | 0.0 | n/a |
| (Nicaragua) | North Caribbean Coast Autonomous Region | Nicaragua | Republic | 33,105.98 | 563,088 | 17.01 | Puerto Cabezas |
| (Nueva Esparta) | Nueva Esparta | Venezuela | Dependency | 1,151 | 491,610 | 427.5 | La Asunción |
| (Panama) | Coastal areas of Panama | Independent | Republic | 8,409.3 | 4,351,267 | 150 | Panama City |
| (Puerto Rico) | Puerto Rico | United States | Commonwealth | 9,100 | 3,256,028 | 448.9 | San Juan |
| (Quintana Roo) | Quintana Roo | Mexico | State | 44,705.2 | 1,857,985 | 42 | Chetumal |
| (Saba (island)) | Saba | Netherlands | Special municipality | 13 | 1,537 | 118.2 | The Bottom |
| (Archipelago of San Andrés, Providencia and Santa Catalina) | San Andrés and Providencia | Colombia | Department | 52.5 | 75,167 | 1,431 | San Andrés |
| (Saint Barthélemy) | Saint Barthélemy | France | Overseas collectivity | 21 | 7,448 | 354.7 | Gustavia |
| (Saint Kitts and Nevis) | Saint Kitts and Nevis | Independent | Constitutional monarchy | 261 | 47,606 | 199.2 | Basseterre |
| (Saint Lucia) | Saint Lucia | Independent | Constitutional monarchy | 539 | 179,651 | 319.1 | Castries |
| (Collectivity of Saint Martin) | Saint Martin | France | Overseas collectivity | 54 | 29,820 | 552.2 | Marigot |
| (Saint Vincent and the Grenadines) | Saint Vincent and the Grenadines | Independent | Constitutional monarchy | 389 | 104,332 | 280.2 | Kingstown |
| (Sint Eustatius) | Sint Eustatius | Netherlands | Special municipality | 21 | 2,739 | 130.4 | Oranjestad |
| (Sint Maarten) | Sint Maarten | Kingdom of the Netherlands | Constituent kingdom | 34 | 44,042 | 1,176.7 | Philipsburg |
| (Nicaragua) | South Caribbean Coast Autonomous Region | Nicaragua | Republic | 27,260.02 | 434,270 | 15.93 | Bluefields |
| (Suriname) | Coastal areas of Suriname | Independent | Republic | 163,821 | 612,985 | 3.9 | Paramaribo |
| (Trinidad and Tobago) | Trinidad and Tobago | Independent | Republic | 5,128 | 1,525,663 | 271.2 | Port of Spain |
| (Turks and Caicos Islands) | Turks and Caicos Islands | United Kingdom | Overseas territory | 948 | 45,114 | 34.8 | Cockburn Town |
| (United States Virgin Islands) | United States Virgin Islands | United States | Territory | 347 | 100,091 | 317.0 | Charlotte Amalie |
| (Venezuela) | Coastal areas of Venezuela | Independent | Republic | 916,445 | 28,199,867 | 32 | Caracas |
| Total | | | | 235,897 | 44,636,789 | 189.4 | |

== Demographics ==
=== Life expectancy ===
Life expectancy in some countries of the Caribbean in 2023, according to estimation of the World Bank Group:

World Bank Group (2023)
| Countries and territories | 2023 | | | | Historical data | | | | | | | | | | | recovery from COVID-19: 2019→2023 |
| Countries and territories | All | Male | Female | Sex gap | 2014 | 2014 →2019 | 2019 | 2019 →2020 | 2020 | 2020 →2021 | 2021 | 2021 →2022 | 2022 | 2022 →2023 | 2023 | recovery from COVID-19: 2019→2023 |
|---|---|---|---|---|---|---|---|---|---|---|---|---|---|---|---|---|
| Puerto Rico | 81.69 | 78.03 | 85.24 | 7.21 | 80.04 | 1.40 | 81.44 | −1.43 | 80.01 | −0.24 | 79.77 | −0.34 | 79.43 | 2.26 | 81.69 | 0.25 |
| Virgin Islands (U.S.) | 80.52 | 77.30 | 83.90 | 6.60 | 78.87 | 0.80 | 79.67 | 0.15 | 79.82 | 0.25 | 80.07 | 0.25 | 80.32 | 0.20 | 80.52 | 0.85 |
| Cayman Islands | 80.36 | 77.98 | 82.87 | 4.89 | 77.86 | 1.19 | 79.05 | 0.18 | 79.23 | 0.07 | 79.30 | 0.68 | 79.98 | 0.37 | 80.36 | 1.31 |
| Saint Martin | 80.22 | 76.77 | 83.84 | 7.07 | 79.73 | 0.35 | 80.08 | 0.01 | 80.08 | 0.12 | 80.21 | 0.03 | 80.24 | −0.01 | 80.22 | 0.15 |
| Cuba | 78.08 | 75.67 | 80.52 | 4.85 | 77.83 | −0.41 | 77.41 | −0.01 | 77.41 | −4.21 | 73.20 | 4.43 | 77.63 | 0.46 | 78.08 | 0.67 |
| Turks and Caicos Islands | 78.01 | 75.83 | 80.30 | 4.47 | 77.21 | 0.48 | 77.69 | −0.19 | 77.50 | −0.27 | 77.23 | 0.68 | 77.92 | 0.09 | 78.01 | 0.32 |
| Antigua and Barbuda | 77.60 | 74.55 | 80.29 | 5.74 | 76.91 | 0.26 | 77.17 | −0.01 | 77.16 | 0.04 | 77.20 | 0.29 | 77.48 | 0.11 | 77.60 | 0.43 |
| British Virgin Islands | 77.28 | 74.53 | 80.05 | 5.52 | 76.53 | 0.32 | 76.84 | 0.05 | 76.89 | −1.60 | 75.30 | 1.88 | 77.18 | 0.10 | 77.28 | 0.43 |
| Curaçao | 76.80 | 72.46 | 80.82 | 8.37 | 76.38 | 0.11 | 76.49 | 0.01 | 76.50 | −0.81 | 75.69 | 1.04 | 76.73 | 0.07 | 76.80 | 0.31 |
| Sint Maarten | 76.37 | 73.70 | 79.53 | 5.83 | 75.73 | −0.05 | 75.68 | −0.68 | 75.00 | −0.50 | 74.50 | 1.68 | 76.18 | 0.19 | 76.37 | 0.69 |
| Aruba | 76.35 | 73.70 | 78.78 | 5.08 | 75.26 | 0.76 | 76.02 | −0.61 | 75.41 | −1.75 | 73.66 | 2.57 | 76.23 | 0.13 | 76.35 | 0.33 |
| Barbados | 76.18 | 73.63 | 78.61 | 4.98 | 75.93 | 0.57 | 76.50 | 0.15 | 76.65 | −0.07 | 76.58 | −0.90 | 75.68 | 0.50 | 76.18 | −0.32 |
| Grenada | 75.20 | 72.36 | 78.36 | 5.99 | 75.05 | −0.07 | 74.97 | 0.05 | 75.02 | −0.50 | 74.52 | 0.63 | 75.15 | 0.05 | 75.20 | 0.23 |
| Bahamas | 74.55 | 70.91 | 78.19 | 7.28 | 74.03 | −2.62 | 71.41 | 1.59 | 72.99 | −2.24 | 70.75 | 3.74 | 74.49 | 0.06 | 74.55 | 3.14 |
| Dominican Republic | 73.72 | 70.53 | 76.97 | 6.44 | 73.14 | −0.03 | 73.11 | −0.48 | 72.64 | −0.88 | 71.76 | 2.45 | 74.21 | −0.49 | 73.72 | 0.61 |
| Trinidad and Tobago | 73.49 | 70.38 | 76.68 | 6.31 | 72.90 | −0.06 | 72.84 | −0.19 | 72.64 | −1.53 | 71.11 | 2.22 | 73.33 | 0.16 | 73.49 | 0.65 |
| World | 73.33 | 70.95 | 75.84 | 4.89 | 71.78 | 1.09 | 72.87 | −0.68 | 72.18 | −0.97 | 71.22 | 1.75 | 72.97 | 0.36 | 73.33 | 0.46 |
| Caribbean small states | 73.03 | 69.82 | 76.36 | 6.54 | 71.26 | 0.56 | 71.82 | −0.19 | 71.63 | −2.23 | 69.40 | 3.21 | 72.61 | 0.42 | 73.03 | 1.22 |
| St. Lucia | 72.70 | 69.31 | 76.30 | 6.99 | 72.68 | −0.43 | 72.25 | 0.06 | 72.31 | −3.19 | 69.12 | 3.55 | 72.67 | 0.03 | 72.70 | 0.45 |
| St. Kitts and Nevis | 72.14 | 68.57 | 76.02 | 7.45 | 71.23 | 0.31 | 71.54 | −0.36 | 71.18 | −1.91 | 69.27 | 1.04 | 70.31 | 1.83 | 72.14 | 0.60 |
| Jamaica | 71.48 | 68.97 | 73.99 | 5.02 | 72.36 | −0.83 | 71.53 | −0.08 | 71.45 | −2.37 | 69.08 | 2.40 | 71.48 | 0.00 | 71.48 | −0.05 |
| St. Vincent and the Grenadines | 71.23 | 68.66 | 74.31 | 5.65 | 70.36 | 0.64 | 70.99 | −1.39 | 69.61 | −0.47 | 69.13 | 2.06 | 71.19 | 0.04 | 71.23 | 0.24 |
| Dominica | 71.13 | 68.21 | 74.55 | 6.33 | 71.19 | 0.12 | 71.31 | −0.04 | 71.27 | −1.44 | 69.83 | 1.25 | 71.08 | 0.05 | 71.13 | −0.17 |
| Haiti | 64.94 | 61.73 | 68.30 | 6.57 | 62.97 | 1.36 | 64.33 | −0.55 | 63.77 | −1.16 | 62.61 | 1.34 | 63.95 | 0.99 | 64.94 | 0.61 |

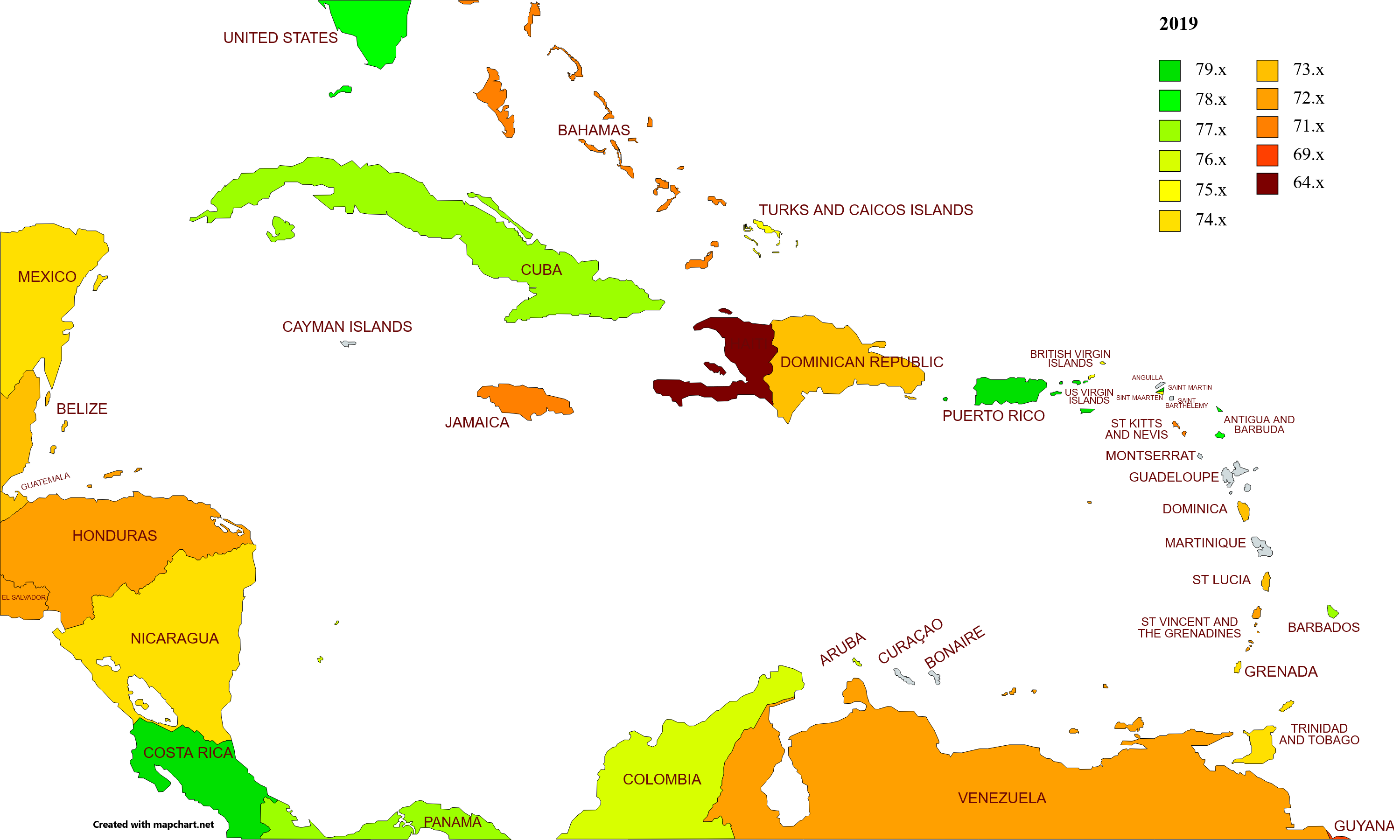
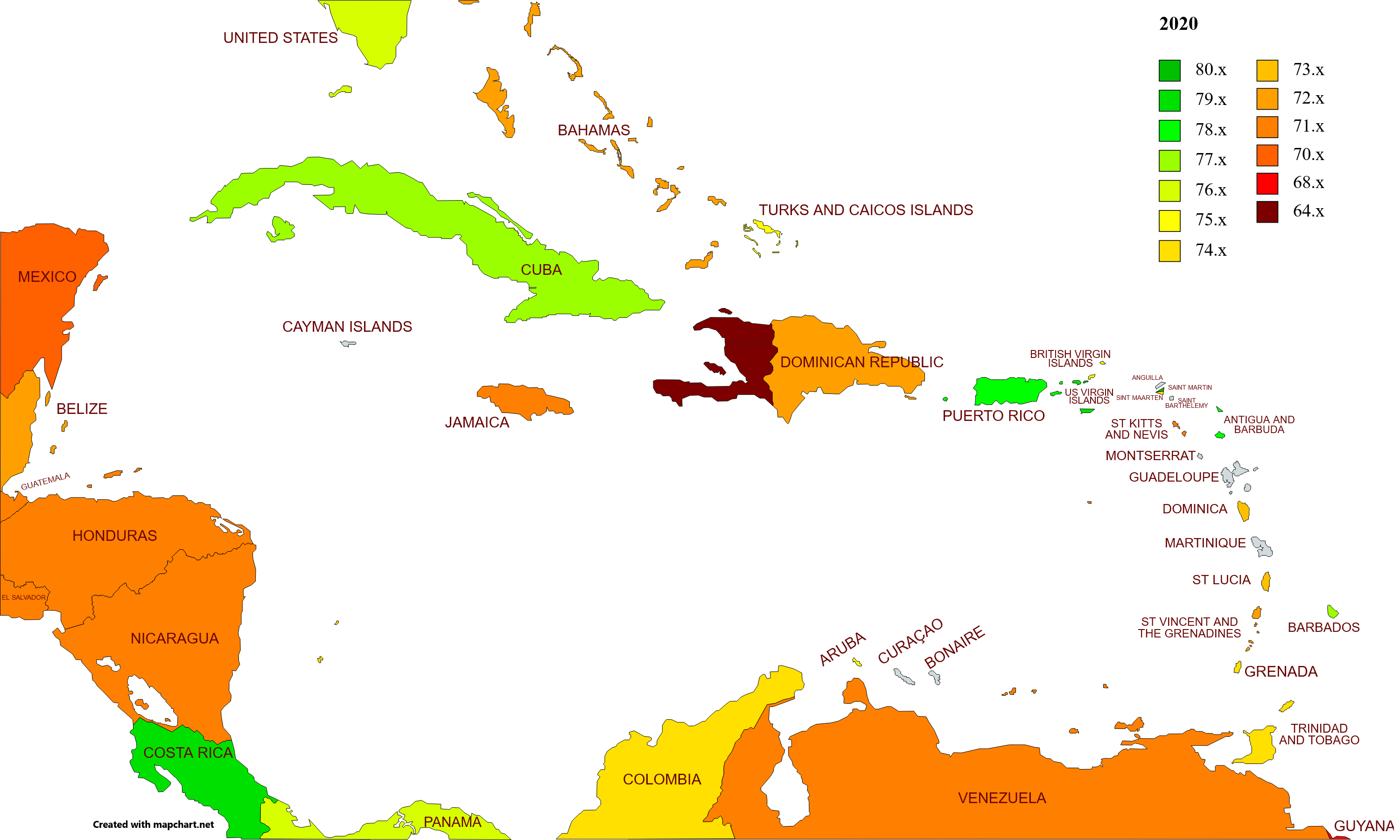
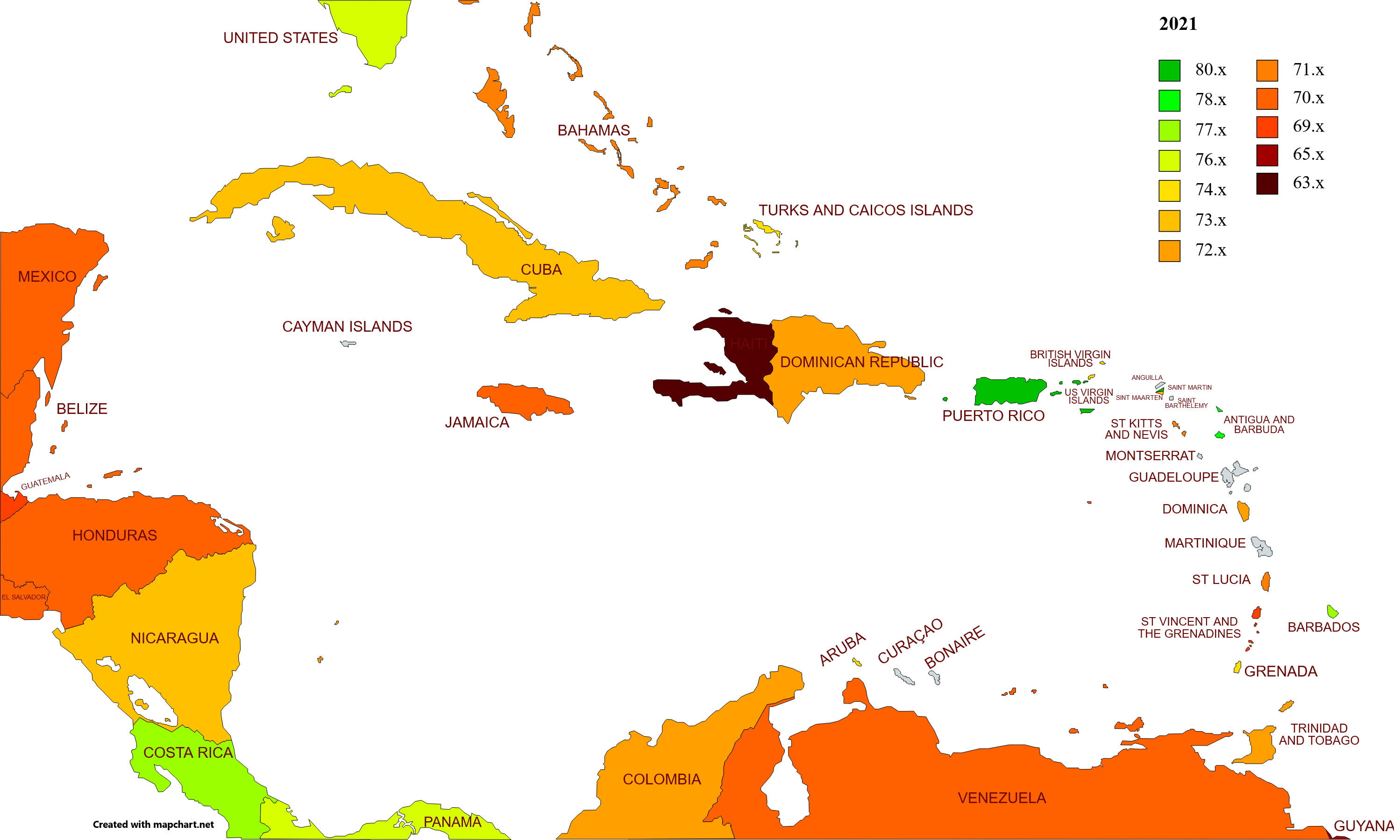
Change in life expectancy in the Caribbean from 2019 to 2021

=== Indigenous groups ===
- Arawak peoples
  - Igneri
  - Taíno
- Caquetio people
- Ciboney
- Ciguayo
- Garifuna
- Kalina
- Kalinago
- Lucayan
- Macorix
- Raizal

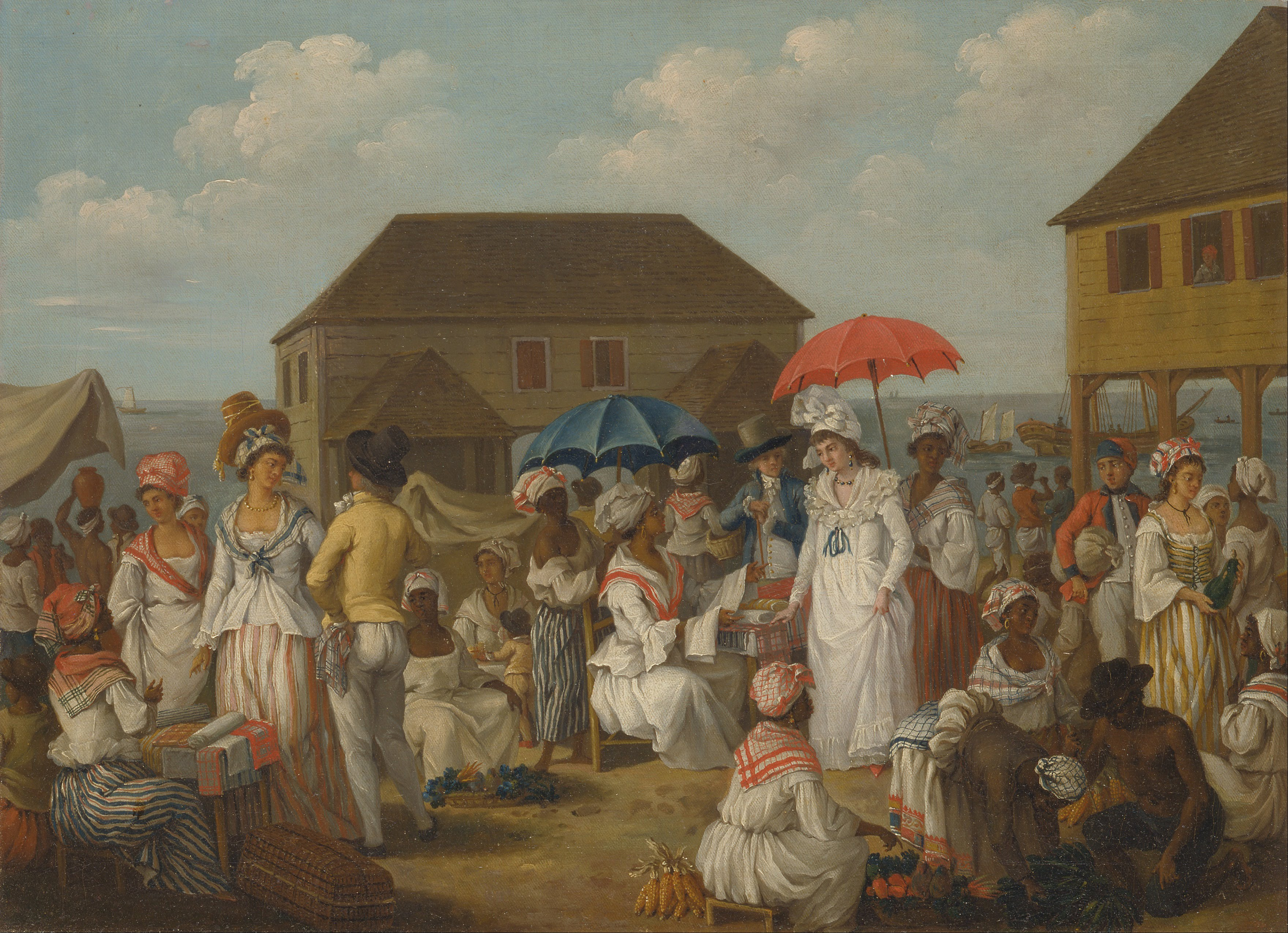
A linen market in Dominica in the 1770s

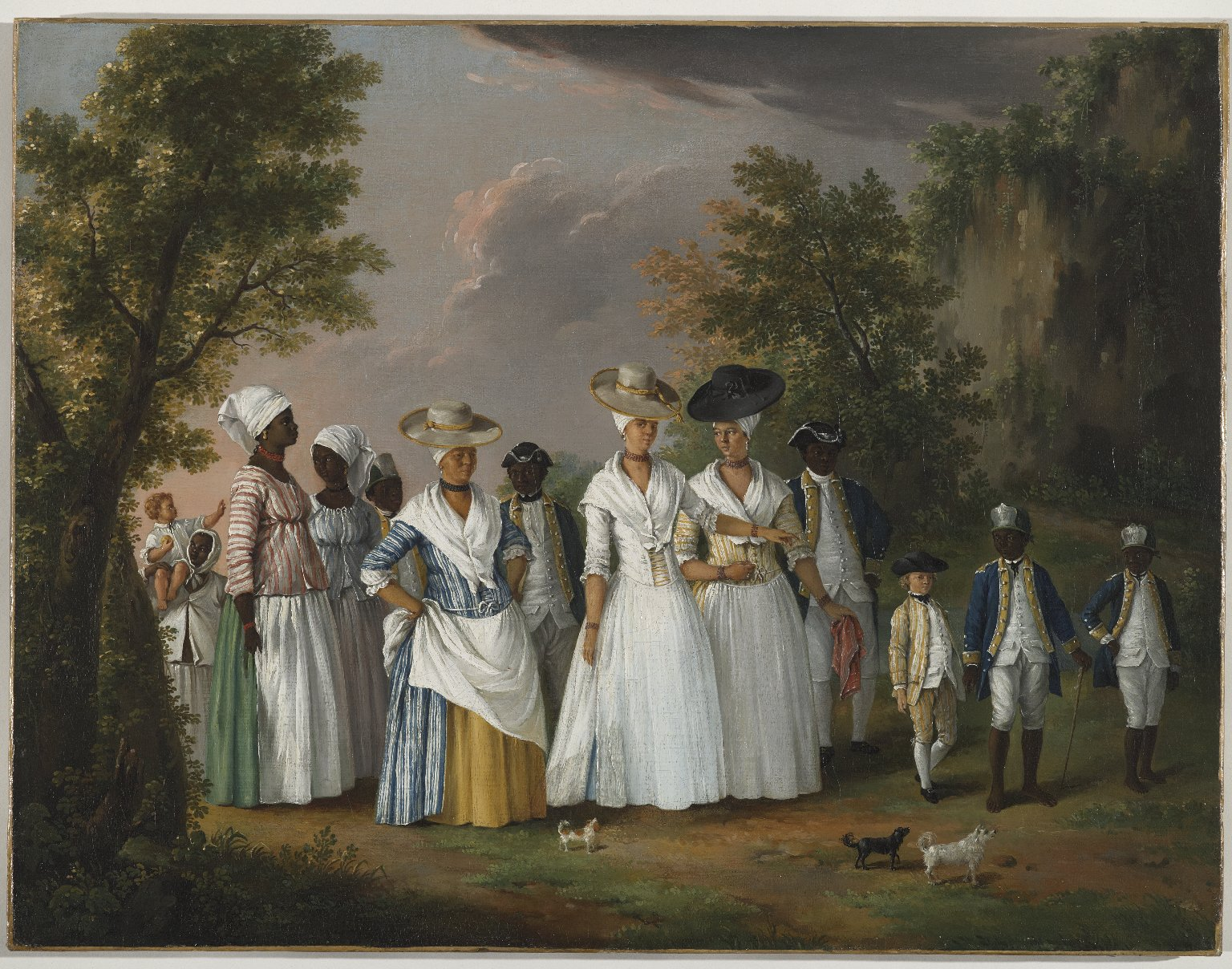
Agostino Brunias. Free Women of Color with Their Children and Servants in a Landscape, Brooklyn Museum

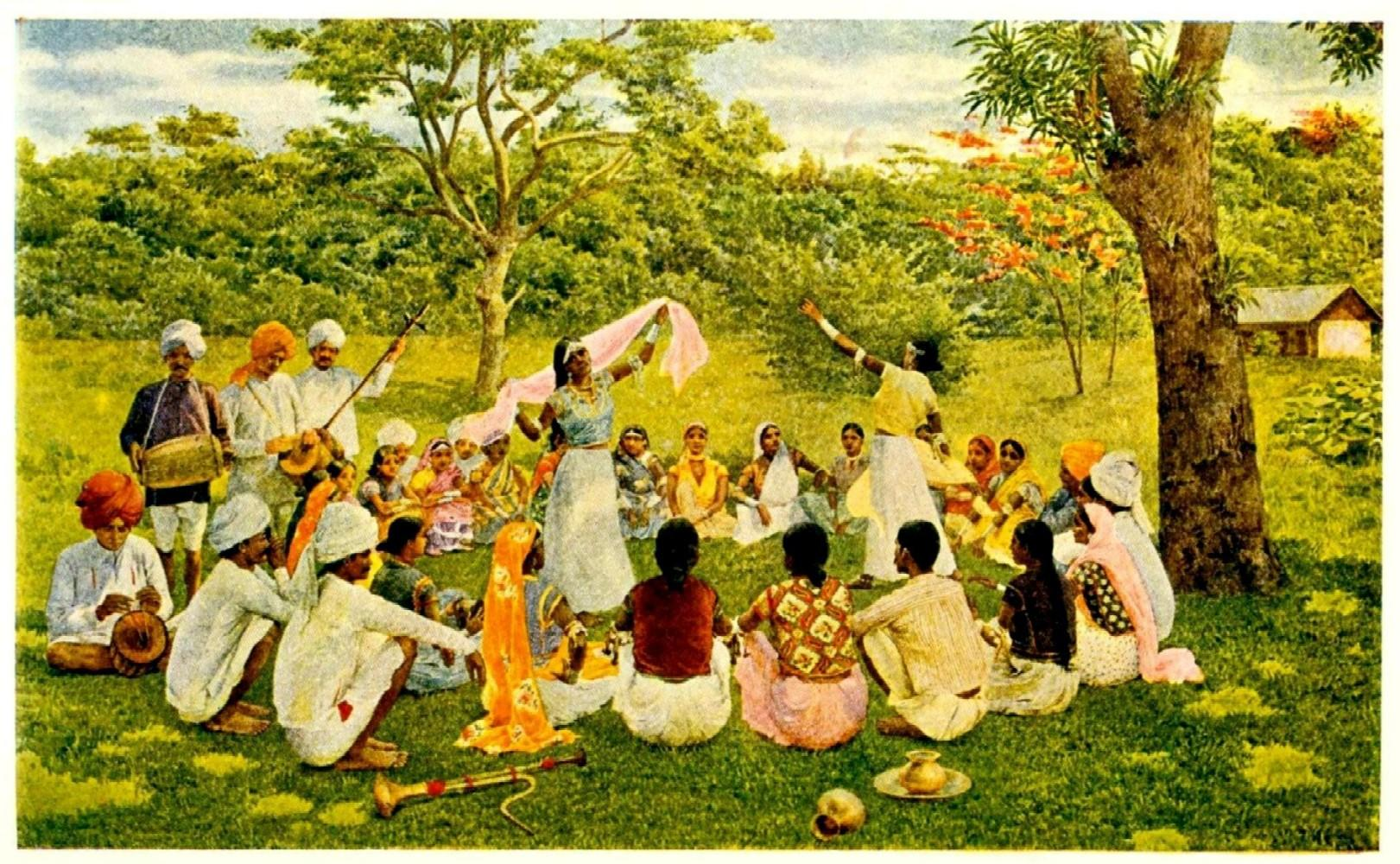
Asian Indians in the late nineteenth century singing and dancing in Trinidad and Tobago

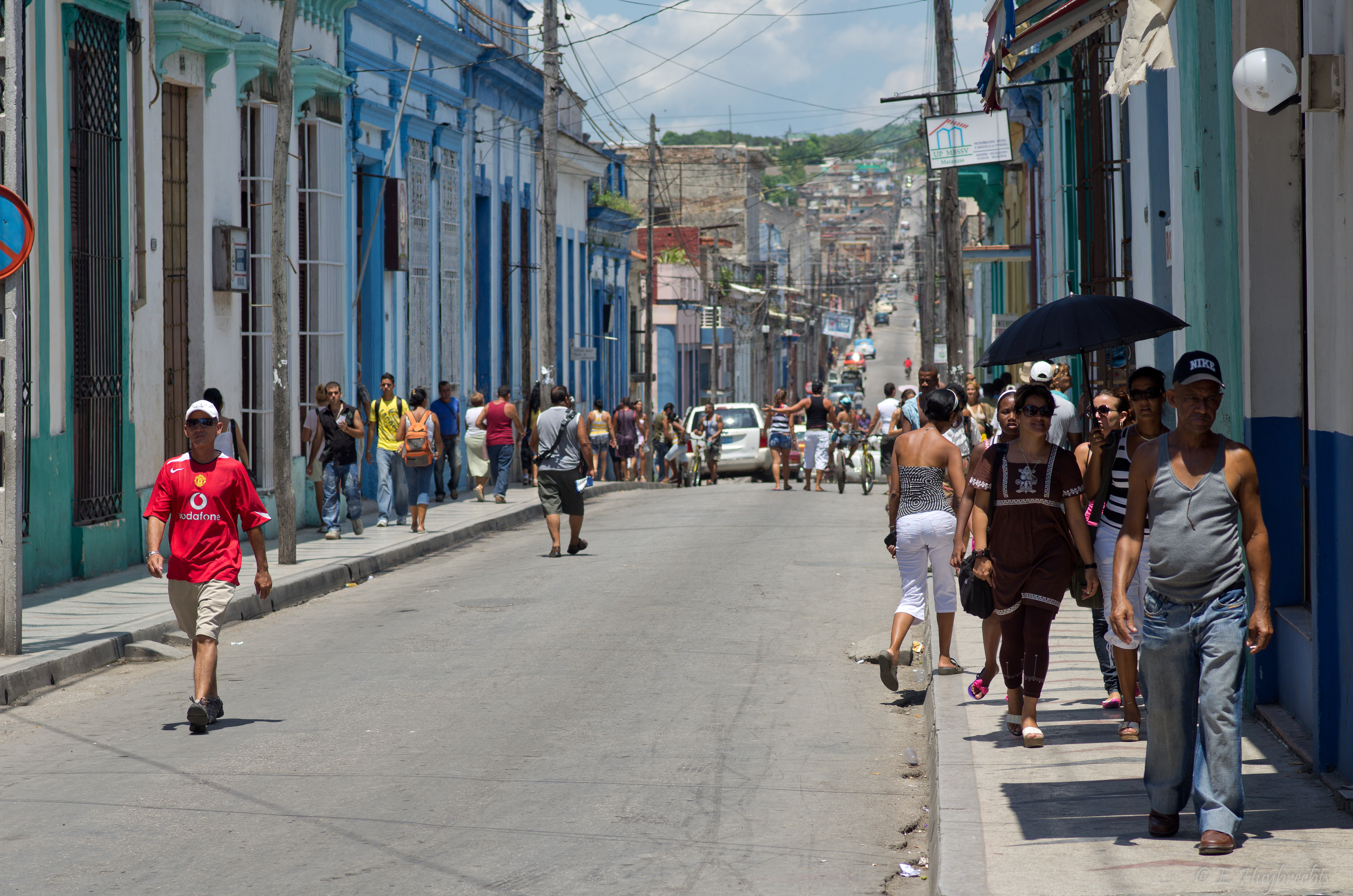
Street scene, Matanzas, Cuba

At the time of European contact, the dominant ethnic groups in the Caribbean included the Taíno of the Greater Antilles and northern Lesser Antilles, the Island Caribs of the southern Lesser Antilles, and smaller distinct groups such as the Guanajatabey of western Cuba and the Ciguayo of eastern Hispaniola. The population of the Caribbean is estimated to have been about 750,000 before European contact. After contact, social disruption and epidemic diseases such as smallpox and measles (to which they had no natural immunity) led to a decline in the Amerindian population, who were replaced by groups such as the Kongo, Igbo, Akan, Fon, and Yoruba, as well as military prisoners from Ireland, who were deported during the Cromwellian reign in England. Immigrants from Britain, Italy, France, Spain, the Netherlands, Portugal, and Denmark also arrived, although the mortality rate was high for both groups.

The population is estimated to have reached 2.2 million by 1800. Immigrants from India, China, Indonesia, and other countries arrived in the mid-19th century as indentured servants. After the Atlantic slave trade ended, the population increased naturally. The regional population was estimated at 37.5 million by 2000.

In Haiti and most of the French, Anglophone and Dutch Caribbean, the population is predominantly of African origin; on many of the islands/nations there are also significant populations of mixed racial origin (including Mulatto-Creole, Dougla, Mestizo, Quadroon, Cholo, Castizo, Criollo, Zambo, Pardo, Chindian, Cocoa panyols, and Eurasian). On the Cayman Islands, Aruba and Belize mixed-race people form the majority of the population. There are also populations of European ancestry; English, French, Dutch, Italian, Portuguese and Spanish ancestry. Asians, especially those of Chinese, Indian descent, and Javanese Indonesians, form a significant minority in parts of the region. Indians form a plurality of the population in Trinidad and Tobago, Guyana, and Suriname. Most of their ancestors arrived in the 19th century as indentured laborers.

The Spanish-speaking Caribbean populations are primarily of European, African, or racially mixed origins. Cuba has a European majority, along with a significant population of African ancestry. Puerto Rico has a mixed race majority with a mixture of European-African-Native American (tri-racial), and a large White and West African (black) minority. The Dominican Republic has the largest mixed-race population, primarily descended from Europeans, West Africans, and Amerindians.

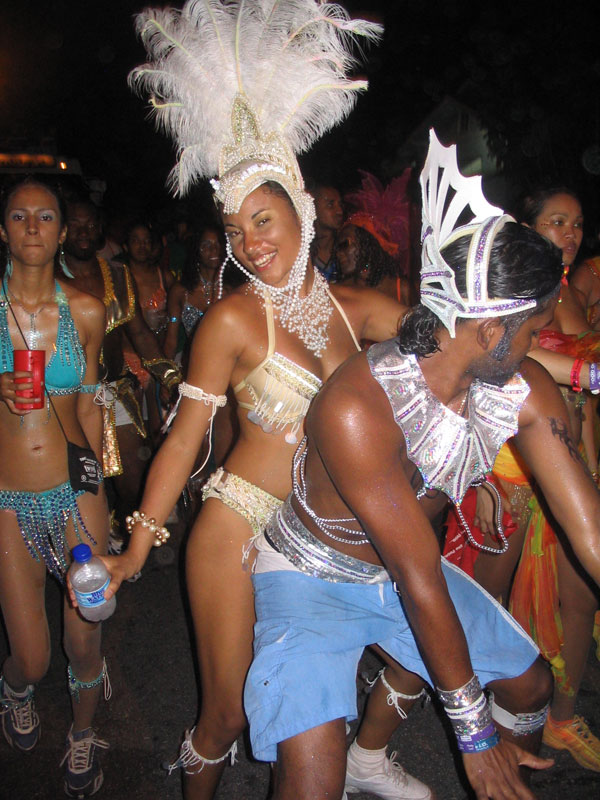
Carnival in Trinidad and Tobago

The majority of Jamaica is of West African origin, in addition to a significant population of mixed racial background and minorities of Chinese, Europeans, Indians, Indigenous, Jews, and Arabs. This is a result of years of importation of slaves and indentured laborers, and migration. Most multi-racial Jamaicans call themselves either mixed-race or brown. Similar populations can be found in the Caricom states of Belize, Guyana, Suriname and Trinidad and Tobago. Trinidad and Tobago has a multiracial cosmopolitan society due to the arrivals of Africans, Indians, Chinese, Arabs and Europeans along with the native indigenous Amerindians population. This multiracial mix has created sub-ethnicities that often straddle the boundaries of major ethnicities, such as the Mulatto-Creole, Mestizo, Pardo, Zambo, Dougla, Chindian, Afro-Asians, Eurasian, and Cocoa panyols.

=== Language ===
Spanish (64%), French (25%), English (14%), Dutch, Haitian Creole, and Papiamento are the predominant official languages of various countries in the region. Almost every Caribbean country has a distinct creole language or dialect that serves as its vernacular language. Most of these do not have official status, with the aforementioned Haitian Creole and Papiamento as notable exceptions. Other languages such as Caribbean Hindustani, Chinese, Javanese, Arabic, Hmong, Amerindian languages, other African languages, other European languages, and other Indian languages like Telugu are also spoken.

=== Religion ===
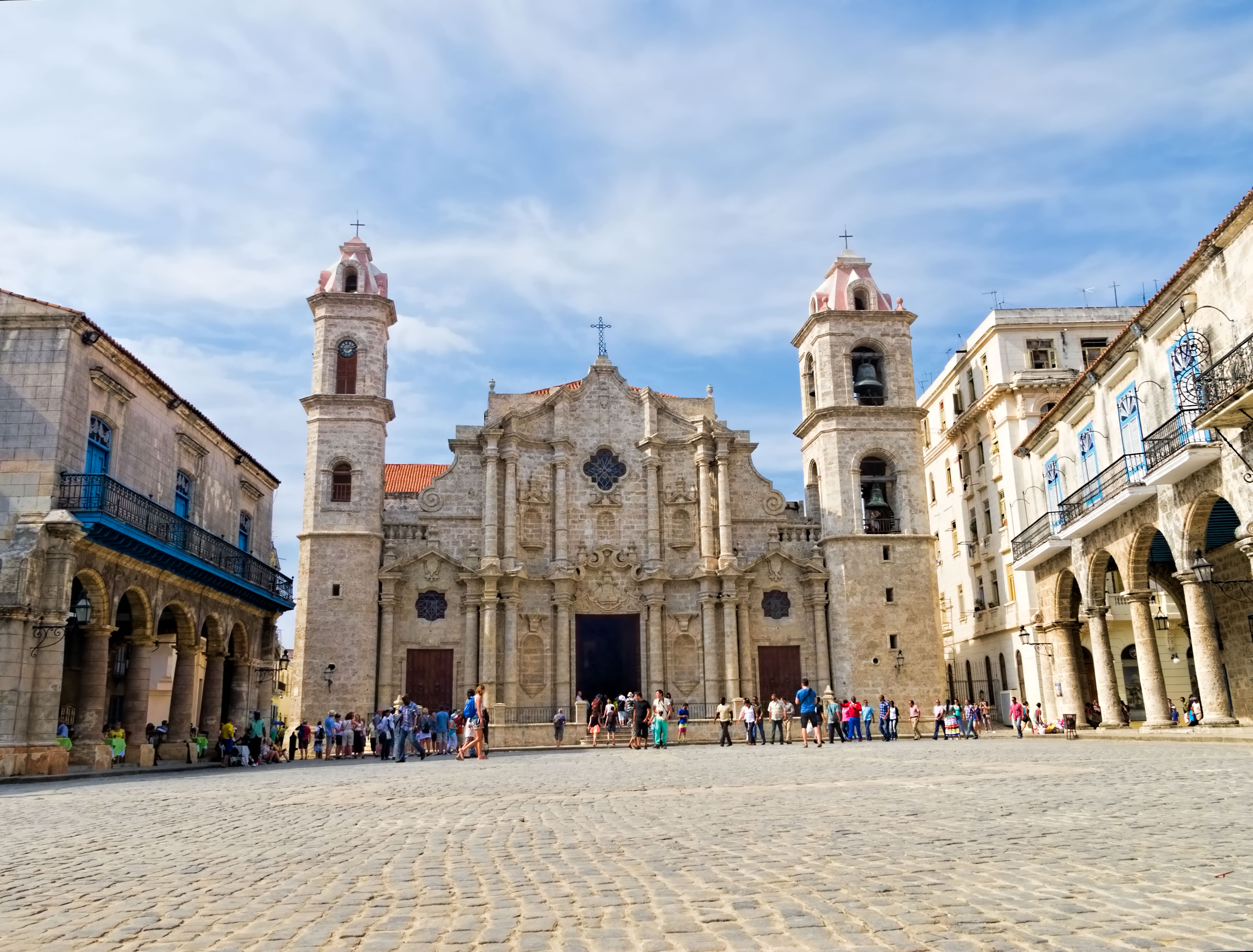
Havana Cathedral (Catholic) in Cuba completed in 1777

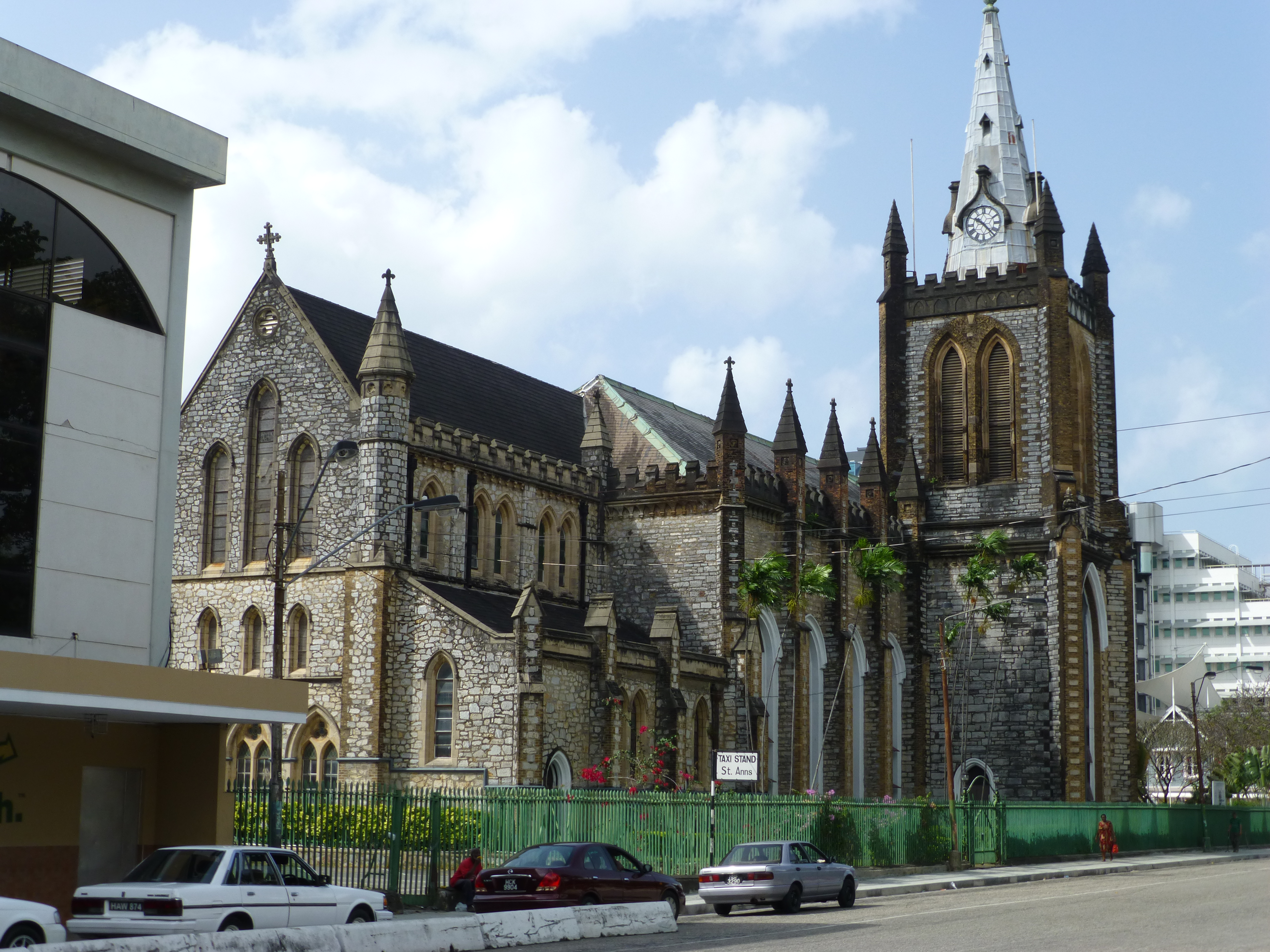
Holy Trinity Cathedral, an Anglican Christian cathedral in Trinidad and Tobago

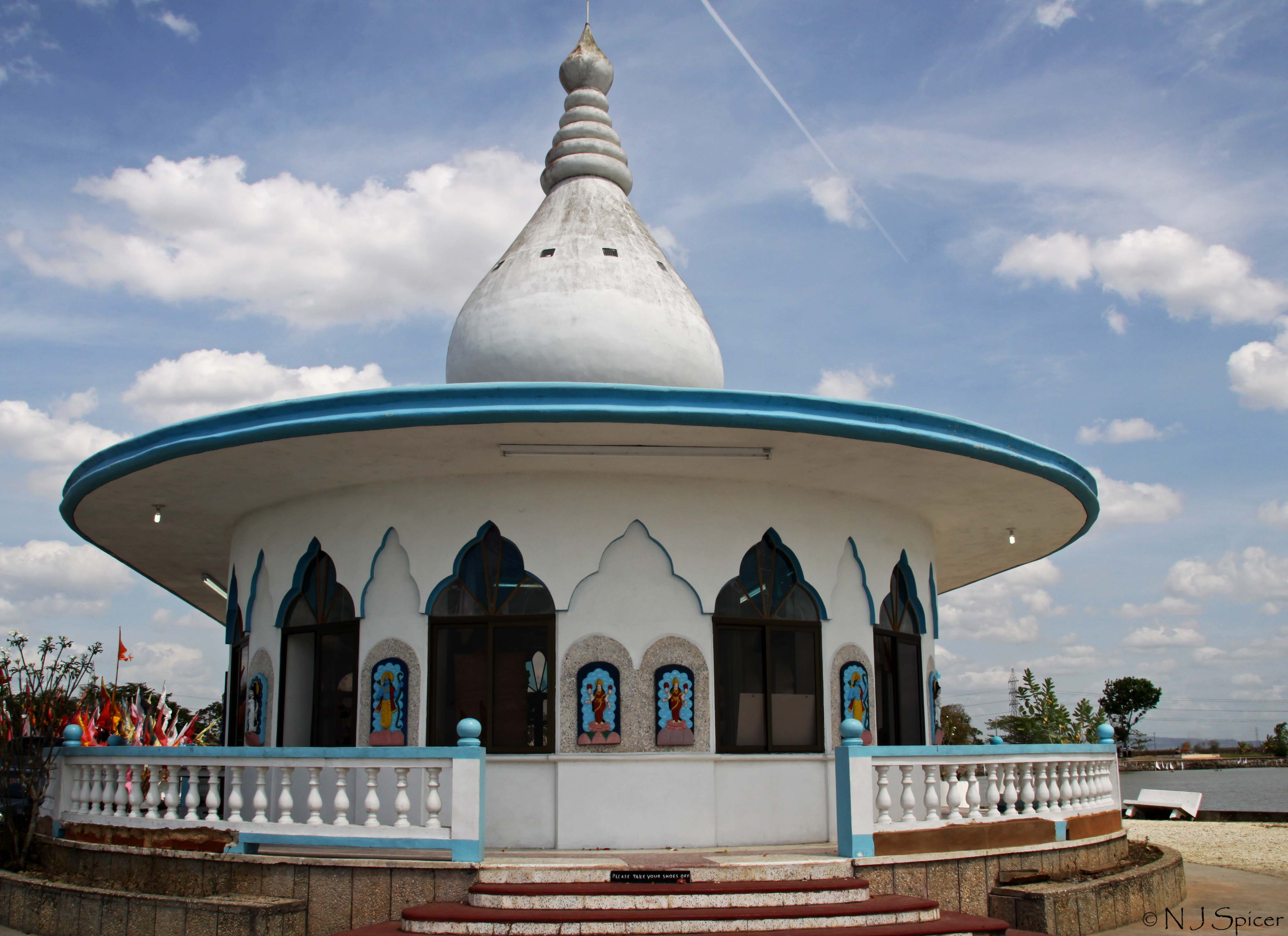
Temple in the Sea, a Hindu mandir in Trinidad and Tobago

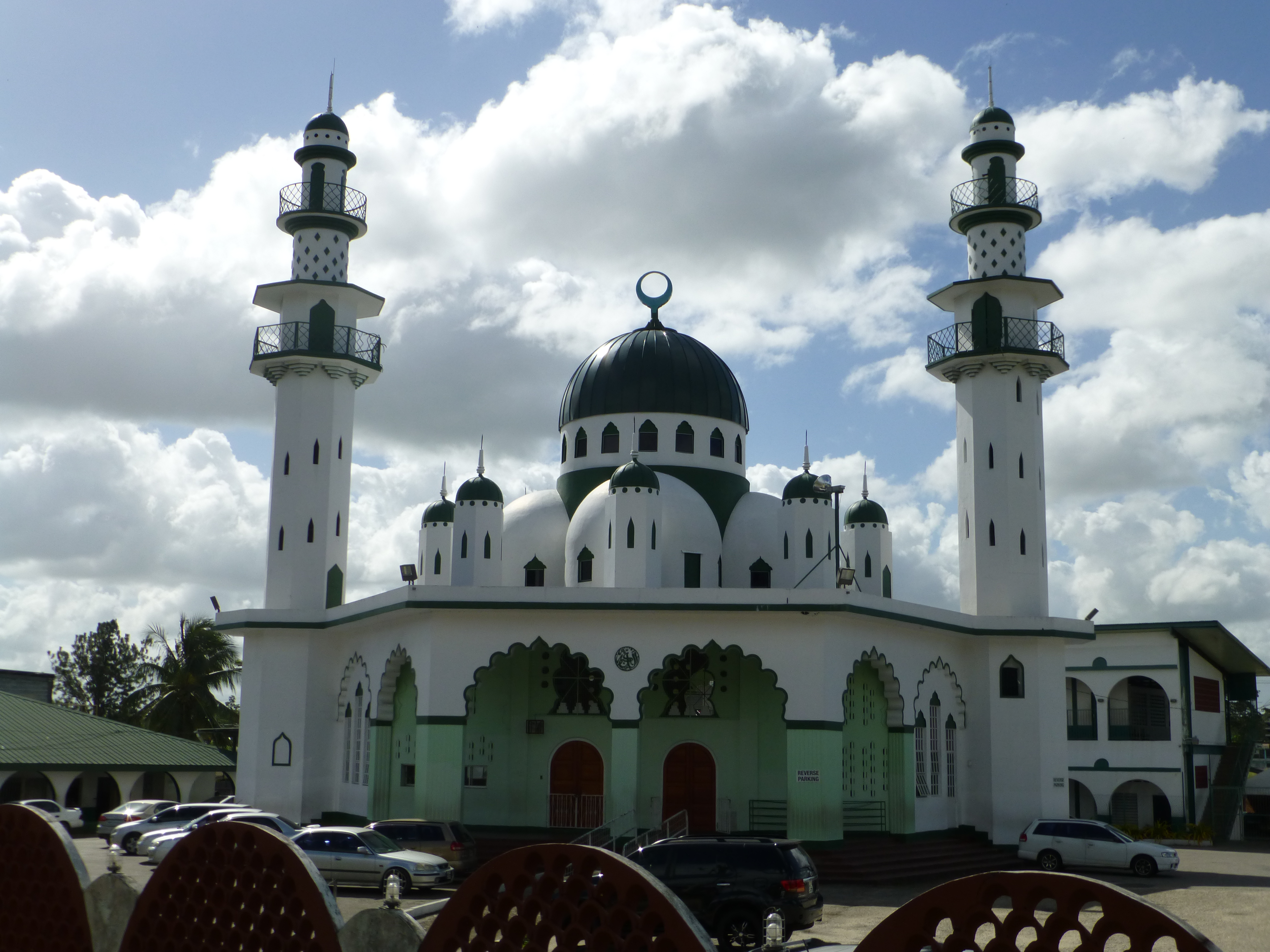
Muhammad Ali Jinnah Memorial Masjid, a Muslim masjid in Trinidad and Tobago

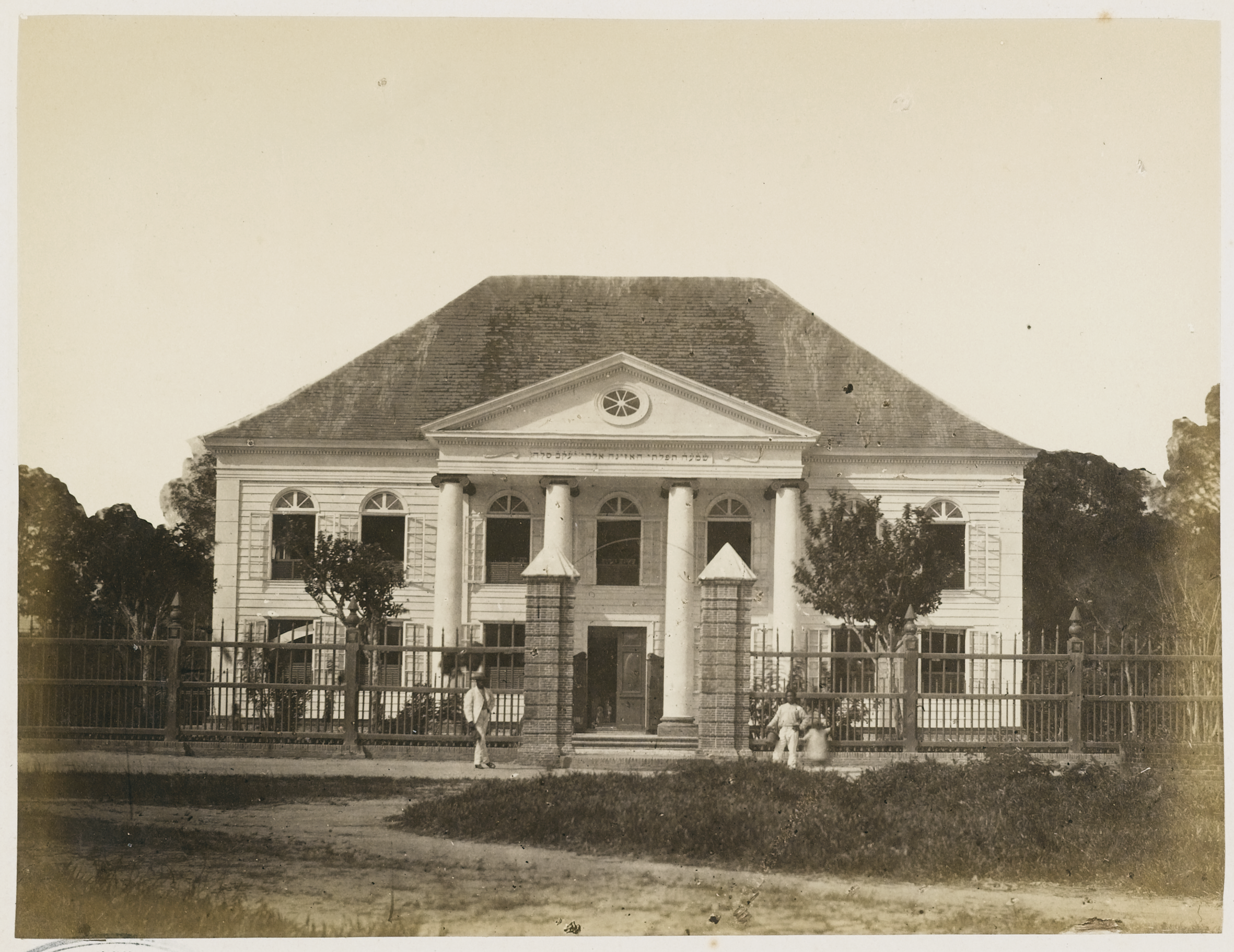
A Jewish synagogue in Suriname

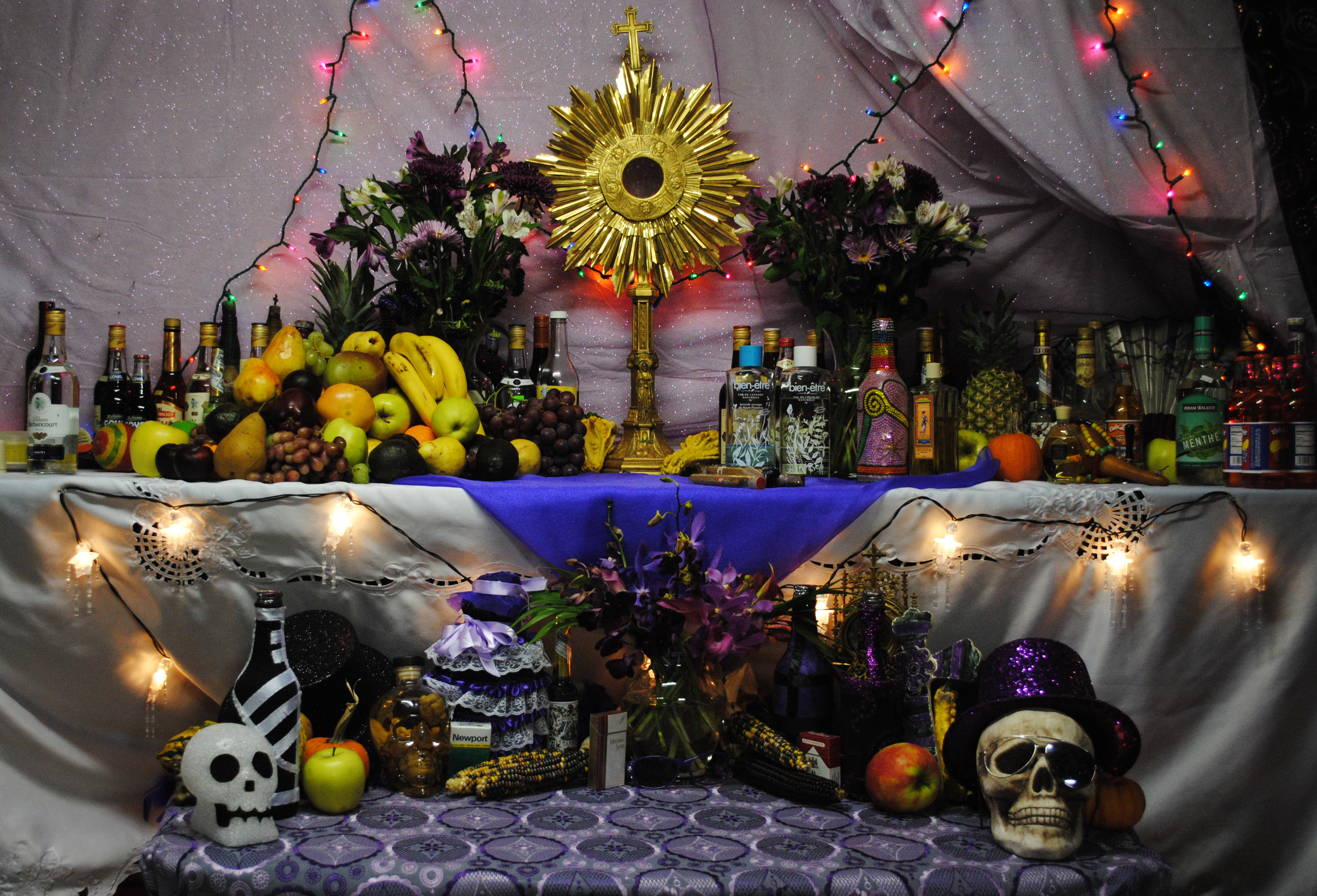
A Haitian Vodou altar

Christianity is the predominant religion in the Caribbean (84.7%). Other religions in the region are Hinduism, Islam, Judaism, Rastafari, Buddhism, Chinese folk religion (incl. Taoism and Confucianism), Baháʼí, Jainism, Sikhism, Kebatinan, Traditional African religions, Yoruba (incl. Trinidad Orisha), Afro-American religions, (incl. Santería, Palo, Umbanda, Brujería, Hoodoo, Candomblé, Quimbanda, Orisha, Xangô de Recife, Xangô do Nordeste, Comfa, Espiritismo, Santo Daime, Obeah, Abakuá, Kumina, Winti, Sanse, Cuban Vodú, Dominican Vudú, Louisiana Voodoo, Haitian Vodou, and Vodun).

== Culture ==
=== Cuisine ===
==== Favourite or national dishes ====
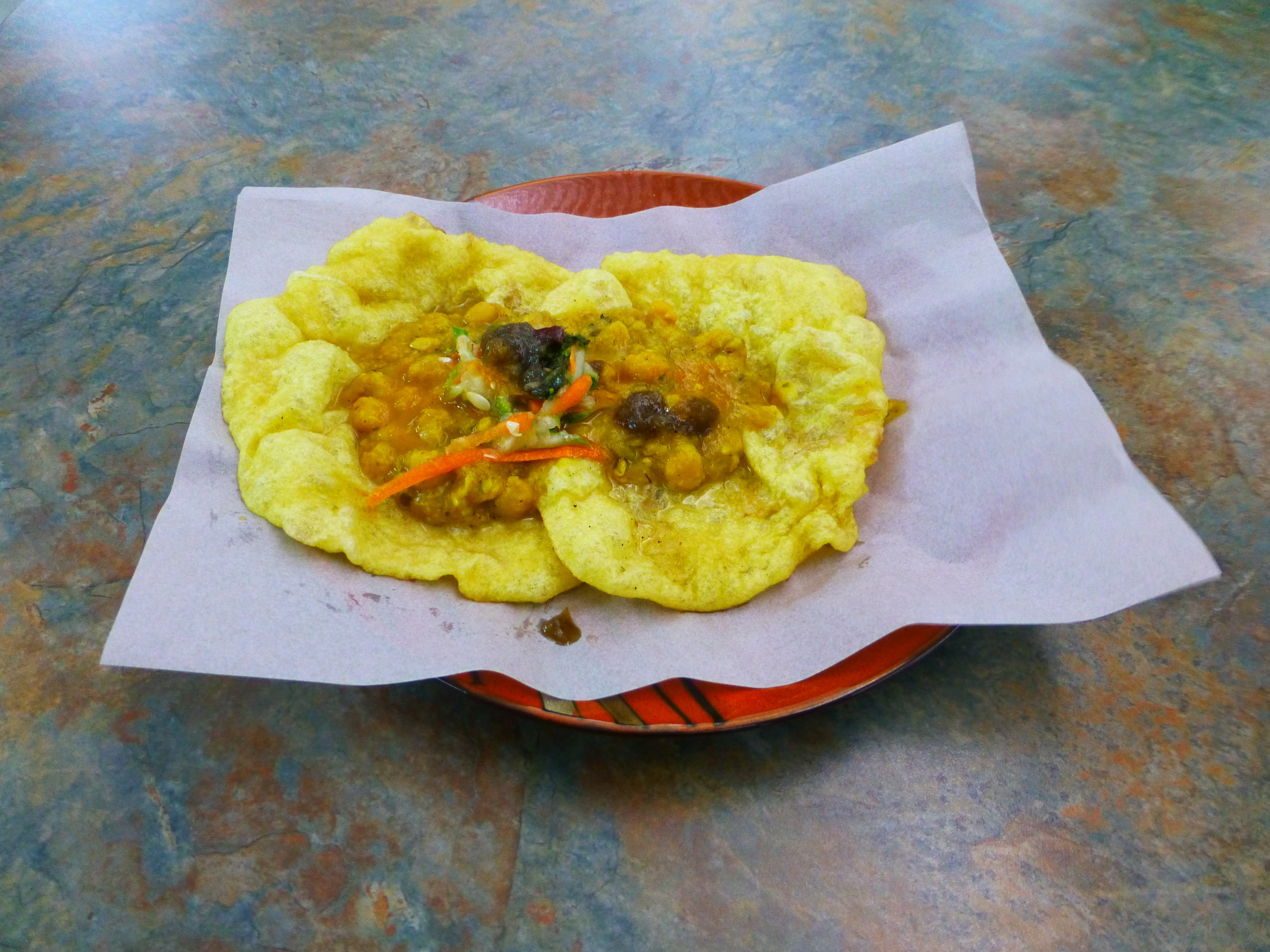
Doubles, one of the national dishes of Trinidad and Tobago

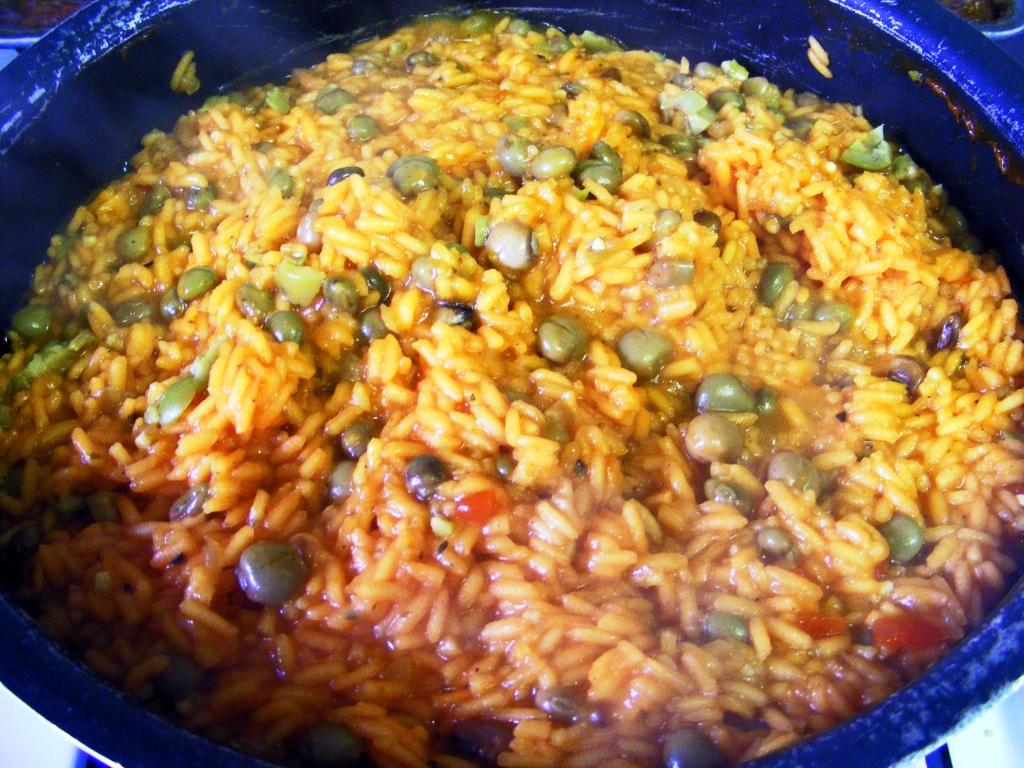
Arroz con gandules, one of the national dishes of Puerto Rico

- Anguilla – rice, peas and fish
- Antigua and Barbuda – fungee and pepperpot
- The Bahamas – Guava duff, Conch Salad, Peas n' Rice, and conch fritters
- Barbados – Cou-cou and flying fish
- Belize – rice and beans, stew chicken with potato salad; white rice, stew beans and fry fish with cole slaw
- British Virgin Islands – fish and fungee
- Cayman Islands – turtle stew, turtle steak, grouper, conch stew, Cayman-style beef with rice and beans, cassava cake
- Colombian Caribbean – rice with coconut milk, arroz con pollo, sancocho, Arab cuisine (due to the large Arab population)
- Cuba – platillo Moros y Cristianos, ropa vieja, lechon, maduros, ajiaco
- Dominica – mountain chicken, rice and peas, dumplings, saltfish, dashin, bakes (fried dumplings), coconut confiture, curry goat, cassava farine, oxtail
- Dominican Republic – arroz con pollo with stewed red kidney beans, pan fried or braised beef, salad/ ensalada de coditos, empanadas, mangú, sancocho
- Grenada – oil down, Roti and rice & chicken
- Guyana – roti and curry, pepperpot, cook-up rice, metemgee, pholourie
- Haiti – griot (fried pork) served with du riz a pois or diri ak pwa (rice and beans)
- Jamaica – ackee and saltfish, callaloo, jerk chicken, curry chicken
- Montserrat – Goat water
- Puerto Rico – yellow rice with green pigeon peas, saltfish stew, roasted pork shoulder, Puerto Rican style pasteles (root vegetable meat patties), chicken fricassée, pasteles, mofongo, tripe soup, tostones, alcapurria, codfish fritters, coconut custard, rice pudding, guava turnovers, Mallorca bread
- Saint Kitts and Nevis – goat water, coconut dumplings, spicy plantain, saltfish, breadfruit
- Saint Lucia – callaloo, dal roti, dried and salted cod, green bananas, rice and beans
- Saint Vincent and the Grenadines – roasted breadfruit and fried jackfish
- Suriname – brown beans and rice, roti and curry, peanut soup, battered fried plantain with peanut sauce, nasi goreng, moksi-alesi, bara, pom
- Trinidad and Tobago – doubles, curry with roti or dal bhat, aloo pie, phulourie, callaloo, bake and shark, curry crab and dumpling
- United States Virgin Islands – stewed goat, oxtail or beef, seafood, callaloo, fungee
- Venezuela Caribbean – fried fish with salad and rise, tostones, sancocho, patacon, pabellon

=== Major sights and landmarks in the region ===
- Harrisons Cave in Barbados - a natural cave complex
- Dunns Falls in Jamaica - a famous water feature near Ocho Rios
- The old city centers of Santo Domingo (Dominican Republic), Willemstad (Curaçao), and San Juan (Puerto Rico)
- St. Maarten's airport for landings over Maho Beach
- The naturally occurring, strikingly pointed Piton peaks in St. Lucia

=== Sport ===
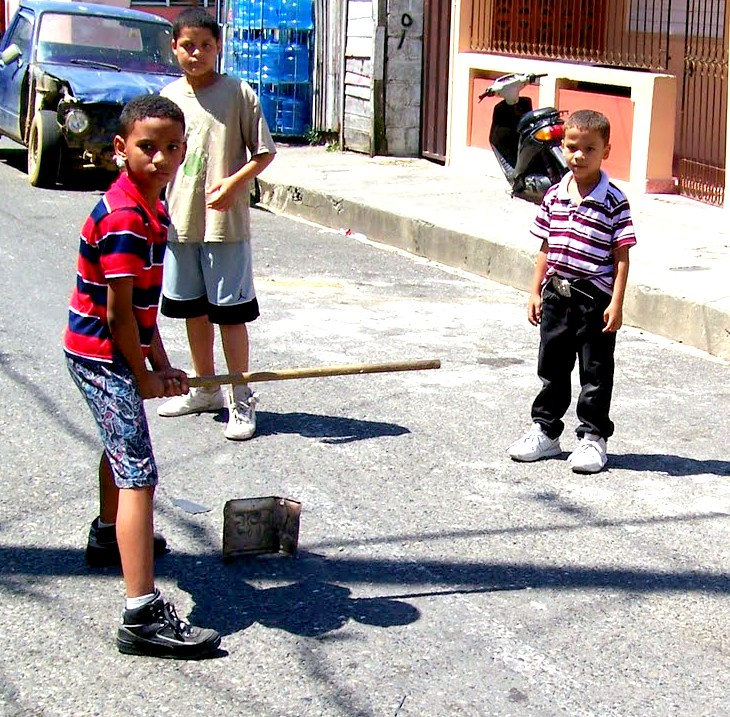
Plaquita, a Dominican street version of cricket. The Dominican Republic was first introduced to cricket through mid-18th century British contact, but switched to baseball after the 1916 American occupation.

Cricket is a very popular sport in the countries and dependencies that formed the British West Indies. The West Indies cricket team competes in Test matches, One Day Internationals and Twenty20 Internationals. The West Indies' major domestic competitions are the Regional Four Day Competition (first-class) and the Regional Super50 (List A one-day) and more recently the Caribbean Premier League (Twenty20).

The regional football governing body is the Caribbean Football Union. National teams have competed in the CFU Championship from 1978 to 1988 and the Caribbean Cup since 1989. The top 4 teams in the tournament qualify for the CONCACAF Gold Cup. Cuba qualified to the FIFA World Cup in 1938, Haiti in 1974, Jamaica in 1998 and Trinidad and Tobago in 2006.

The CFU Club Championship is the regional tournament for football clubs. The winner qualified for the CONCACAF Champions' Cup from 1997 until 2008. Since 2008–09, the top 3 clubs qualify for a preliminary round of the CONCACAF Champions League.

However, the most popular sport in Cuba, Dominican Republic, Puerto Rico, Aruba and Curaçao is baseball. The Caribbean Series, held since 1949, features the national champions from the top Caribbean leagues. The Cuba national team has claimed the Baseball World Cup 25 times, whereas the Dominican Republic won the 2013 World Baseball Classic. In the Pan American Games, Cuba has won 12 editions and Dominican Republic once, whereas Puerto Rico earned the silver medal twice. In the Central American and Caribbean Games, Cuba has won 15 gold medals, whereas Dominican Republic has won three and Puerto Rico two. Several Caribbean players have joined the Major League Baseball: in the 2014 there were 82 Dominicans, 19 Cubans and 11 Puerto Ricans. Notable Caribbean players are Juan Marichal, Pedro Martínez, Roberto Clemente, Orlando Cepeda and Roberto Alomar.

=== Regional institutions ===
Here are some of the bodies that several islands share in collaboration:

- African, Caribbean and Pacific Group of States
- Association of Caribbean States (ACS), Trinidad and Tobago
- Caribbean Association of Industry and Commerce (CAIC), Trinidad and Tobago
- Caribbean Association of National Telecommunication Organizations (CANTO), Trinidad and Tobago
- Caribbean Community (CARICOM), Guyana
- Caribbean Development Bank (CDB), Barbados
- Caribbean Disaster Emergency Management Agency (CDERA), Barbados
- Caribbean Educators Network
- Caribbean Electric Utility Services Corporation (CARILEC), Saint Lucia
- Caribbean Environment Programme (CEP), UN Environment Programme–administered Regional Seas Programme, secretariat located in Kingston, Jamaica
- Caribbean Examinations Council (CXC), Barbados and Jamaica
- Caribbean Financial Action Task Force (CFATF), Trinidad and Tobago
- Caribbean Food Crops Society, Puerto Rico
- Caribbean Football Union (CFU), Jamaica
- Caribbean Hotel & Tourism Association (CHTA), Florida and Puerto Rico
- Caribbean Initiative (Initiative of the IUCN)
- Caribbean Programme for Economic Competitiveness (CPEC), Saint Lucia
- Caribbean Regional Environmental Programme (CREP), Barbados
- Caribbean Regional Fisheries Mechanism (CRFM), Belize
- Caribbean Regional Negotiating Machinery (CRNM), Barbados and Dominican Republic
- Caribbean Telecommunications Union (CTU), Trinidad and Tobago
- Caribbean Tourism Organization (CTO), Barbados
- Community of Latin American and Caribbean States (CELAC)
- Foundation for the Development of Caribbean Children, Barbados
- Latin America and Caribbean Network Information Centre (LACNIC), Brazil and Uruguay
- Latin American and the Caribbean Economic System, Venezuela
- Organisation of Eastern Caribbean States (OECS), Saint Lucia
- United Nations Economic Commission for Latin America and the Caribbean (ECLAC), Chile and Trinidad and Tobago
- University of the West Indies, Jamaica, Trinidad and Tobago, Barbados, and Antigua & Barbuda. In addition, the fourth campus, the Open Campus was formed in June 2008 as a result of an amalgamation of the Board for Non-Campus Countries and Distance Education, Schools of Continuing Studies, the UWI Distance Education Centres and Tertiary Level Units. The Open Campus has 42 physical sites in 16 Anglophone Caribbean countries.
- West Indies Cricket Board, Antigua and Barbuda
- The Caribbean World

== See also ==
- African diaspora
- Anchor coinage
- British African-Caribbean people
- Caribbean people
- Climate change in the Caribbean
- CONCACAF
- Council on Hemispheric Affairs
- Economy of the Caribbean
- South Asian diaspora
  - Indo-Caribbean
    - Indo-Caribbean diaspora
- List of Caribbean music genres
- List of sovereign states and dependent territories in the Caribbean
- Non-resident Indian and person of Indian origin
- Piracy in the Caribbean
- Politics of the Caribbean
- Democracy in the Caribbean
- Tourism in Latin America and the Caribbean

Geography:

- Americas (terminology)
- List of archipelagos by number of islands
- List of Caribbean islands
- List of indigenous names of Eastern Caribbean islands
- List of mountain peaks of the Caribbean
- List of Ultras of the Caribbean
- Middle America (Americas)
- Latin America and the Caribbean

== Sources ==
This article incorporates text from a free content work. Licensed under CC BY 4.0 (license statement/permission). Text taken from Global Forest Resources Assessment 2025, Food and Agriculture Organization of the United Nations (FAO).

== Bibliography ==
- Engerman, Stanley L. "A Population History of the Caribbean", pp. 483–528 in A Population History of North America Michael R. Haines and Richard Hall Steckel (Eds.), Cambridge University Press, 2000, ISBN 0-521-49666-7.
- Hillman, Richard S., and Thomas J. D'agostino, eds. Understanding the Contemporary Caribbean, London: Lynne Rienner, 2003 ISBN 1-58826-663-X.
