= Indigenous languages of the Caribbean =

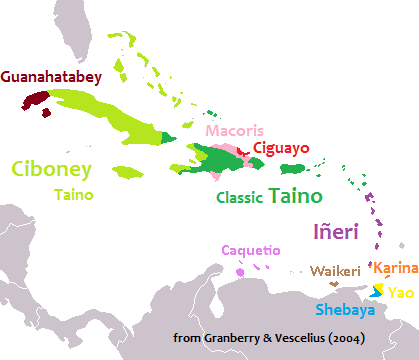
Languages of the pre-Columbian Caribbean, according to Julian Granberry and Gary Vescelius. Mainland populations of several languages is not shown.: Arawakan Ciboney Taíno Classic Taíno Iñeri Shebaya Caquetio Cariban Karina Yao / Unclassified Guanahatabey Macoris Ciguayo Waikeri

The Indigenous peoples of the Caribbean spoke several languages before European contact. Two primary language families were present, being the Arawakan languages and the Cariban languages. Four other languages, belonging to neither of those families, are poorly attested and remain unclassified for lack of data.

== Languages ==
=== Arawakan languages ===
Arawakan languages were spoken throughout the Caribbean, on nearly all inhabited islands, at the time of European contact. They included Taíno (with dialects Ciboney and Lucayan) in the Greater Antilles and the Bahamas; Kalinago a.k.a. Igneri in the Lesser Antilles; Lokono, Nepuyo and Shebayo on Trinidad; and the poorly attested Caquetío on the ABC islands in the western Leeward Antilles.

=== Cariban languages ===
Arriving after the Arawakan languages, a few Cariban languages were spoken in the Caribbean, and indeed gave the region its name. These were Kariʼnja in the Lesser Antilles, and Yao and Carinepagoto on Trinidad.

=== Unclassified languages ===
There were three non-Arawakan and non-Cariban populations in the Greater Antilles at the time of the Spanish Conquest, and they were extinct within a century. These were

- the Guanahatabey of western Cuba (sometimes confused with the Arawakan Ciboney);
- the Macorix (Mazorij) in two populations: the Pedernales Peninsula and northeastern Hispaniola (modern Dominican Republic);
- the Ciguayo (Siwayo) of northeastern Hispaniola (Samaná Peninsula).

They were evidently completely mutually unintelligible with Taíno. Ciguayo and Macorix were apparently moribund when chronicler De las Casas arrived on the island in 1502. He wrote in his Historia (1527–1559),

Es aquí de saber que un gran pedazo desta costa, bien más de 25 ó 30 leguas, y 15 buenas, y aún 20 de ancho, hasta las sierras que hacen desta parte del Norte la Gran Vega inclusive, era poblada de unas gentes que se llamaban mazoriges, y otras ciguayos, y tenían diversas lenguas de la universal de toda la isla. No me acuerdo si diferían éstos en la lengua, como ha tantos años, y no hay hoy uno ni ninguno a quien lo preguntar, puesto que conversé hartas veces con ambas generaciones, y son pasados ya más de cincuenta años.
("It is worth noting here that a large section of this coast, at least 25 or 30 leagues, and a good 15 or maybe 20 wide, up to the hills which together with the Great Plain make up this part of the coast, was populated by peoples known as Mazorij, and others [known as] Ciguayos, and they had different languages than the one common to the entire island. I do not remember if they differed [from each other] in language, as it has been many years, and there is not a single person today to ask, as I have spoken often enough with both generations, and more than 50 years have passed.")

However, elsewhere he notes that the neighboring languages were not intelligible with each other.

Tres lenguas habia en esta Isla distintas, que la una á la otra no se entendía; la una era de la gente que llamábamos del Macoríx de abajo, y la otra de los vecinos del Macoríx de arriba, que pusimos arriba por cuarta y por sexta provincias; la otra lengua fué la universal de toda la tierra.
("Three languages on this island [of Hispaniola] were distinct, in that they could not understand one another; the first was that of the people [of the region] we called the Lower Macorix, and the other that of their neighbors of the Upper Macorix [the Ciguayos], which we described above as the 4th and 6th provinces; the other language was the universal one of all the land".)

In addition, the Waikerí inhabited the Nueva Esparta islands in the eastern Leeward Antilles. Their language was self-reported to be related to Warao.

== Proposed relationships of the unclassified languages ==
Little else is known of the unclassified languages apart from the word for ‘gold’ in Ciguayo, tuob, mentioned in the sentence immediately preceding the first passage above:

Aquí no llamaban caona al oro como en la primera parte desta isla, ni nozay como en la isleta de Guanahaní o San Salvador, sino tuob.
("Here they don't call gold caona, as in the first part of this island, nor nozay as in the islet of Guanahani or San Salvador, but tuob.")

Tuob (whether two syllables as [tu.ob] or one as [twob]) is not a possible Taíno word. Both the Arawak and Carib languages had a simple CV-syllable structure, suggesting that Ciguayo was not just unintelligible, but actually of a different language family than the two known languages of the Caribbean. Granberry (1991) has speculated that they may have been related, not to the languages of South America as Taíno was, but to languages of Central America which had more similar syllable structures. Western Cuba is close enough to the Yucatán Peninsula for crossings by canoe at the time of the Conquest, and indeed a genetic study in 2020 suggested a Central American origin of the pre-Arawakan population.

In Ciguayo, there is also the proper name Quisqueya (Kiskeya), and in Macorix a negative form, baeza. The Guanahani Taino (Ciboney in the proper sense) word for ‘gold’, nozay, elsewhere spelled nuçay (nosai, nusai), may be of Warao origin, as the Warao word for ‘gold’ is naséi simo ('yellow pebble'). However, trade words like 'gold' are readily borrowed.
