= Chiefdoms of Hispaniola =

Indigenous chiefdoms in Ayiti or Hispaniola

- –1492
- Common languages: Taíno
- Minority languages: Ciguayo, Macorix
- Government: Cacicazgo
- Cacique
- History
  - European discovery of Hispaniola: 5 December 1492

Population
  - 1500 estimate: 70,000
Succeeded by
Columbian Viceroyalty
- Today part of: Dominican Republic, Haiti

The chiefdoms of Hispaniola (cacicazgo in Spanish) were the primary pre-Columbian political units employed by the Indigenous inhabitants of Hispaniola (Taíno: Haití, Babeque, Bohío; Ciguayo: Quisqueya) in the early historical era, including the Taíno, the Ciguayos, and the Macorix. At the time of European contact in 1492, the island was divided into five Taíno chiefdoms (in Spanish, cacicazgos), each headed by a cacique. Below him were lesser caciques presiding over villages or districts and nitaínos, an elite class.

The Indigenous peoples of Hispaniola principally spoke Taíno, which was spoken across the islands of the Greater Antilles, but also two minor languages that were already moribund at the time of European contact. At this time, the Taíno were at war with a rival Indigenous group, the Kalinago. In 1508, there were about 60,000 Indigenous people on the island of Hispaniola; by 1531, infectious disease epidemics and exploitation had resulted in a dramatic decline in population.

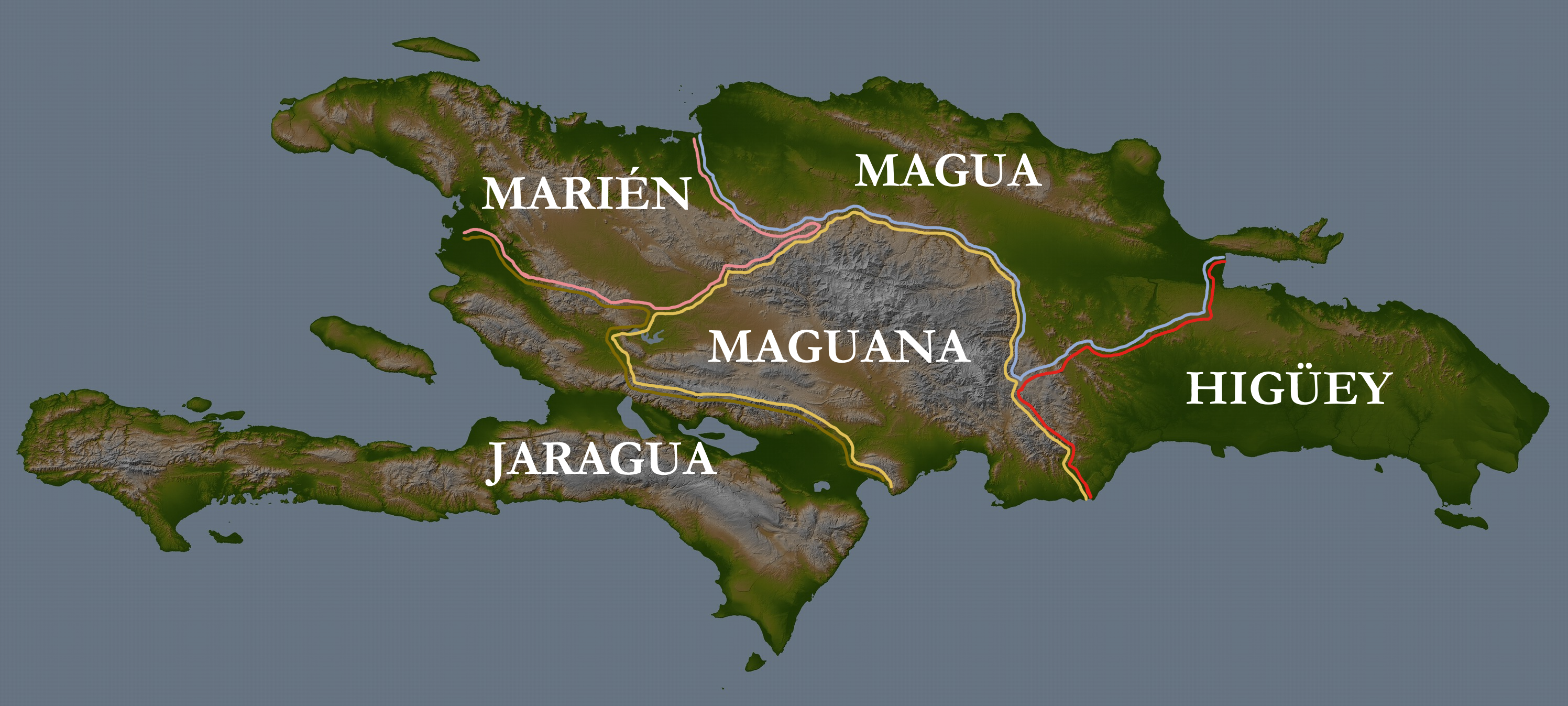
This diagram shows the distribution of the island into chiefdoms upon Columbus's arrival in 1492, according to the Admiral's Journal of Navigation and Fray Bartolomé de las Casas's Apologetic History. The chiefdoms are represented with different colors.

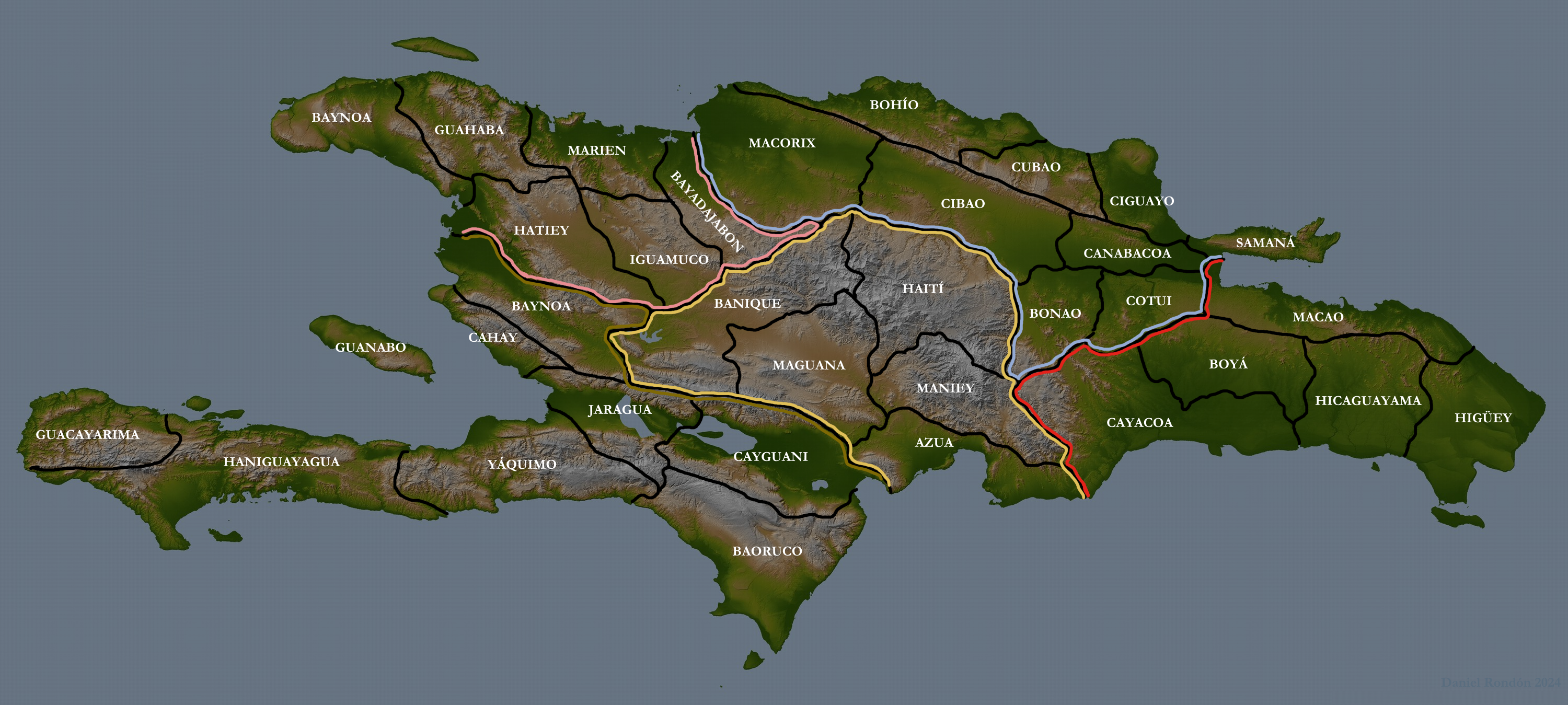
The chiefdoms' subdivisions

The boundaries of each cacicazgo were precise. The first inhabitants of the island used geographic elements as references, such as major rivers, high mountains, notable valleys and plains. This enabled them to define each territory. Each was divided into cacique nitaínos, subdivisions headed by the cacique helpers. The entries below relate the territory of each former cacique to the modern-day provinces of the Dominican Republic and the departments of Haiti.

== Chiefdom of Marién ==
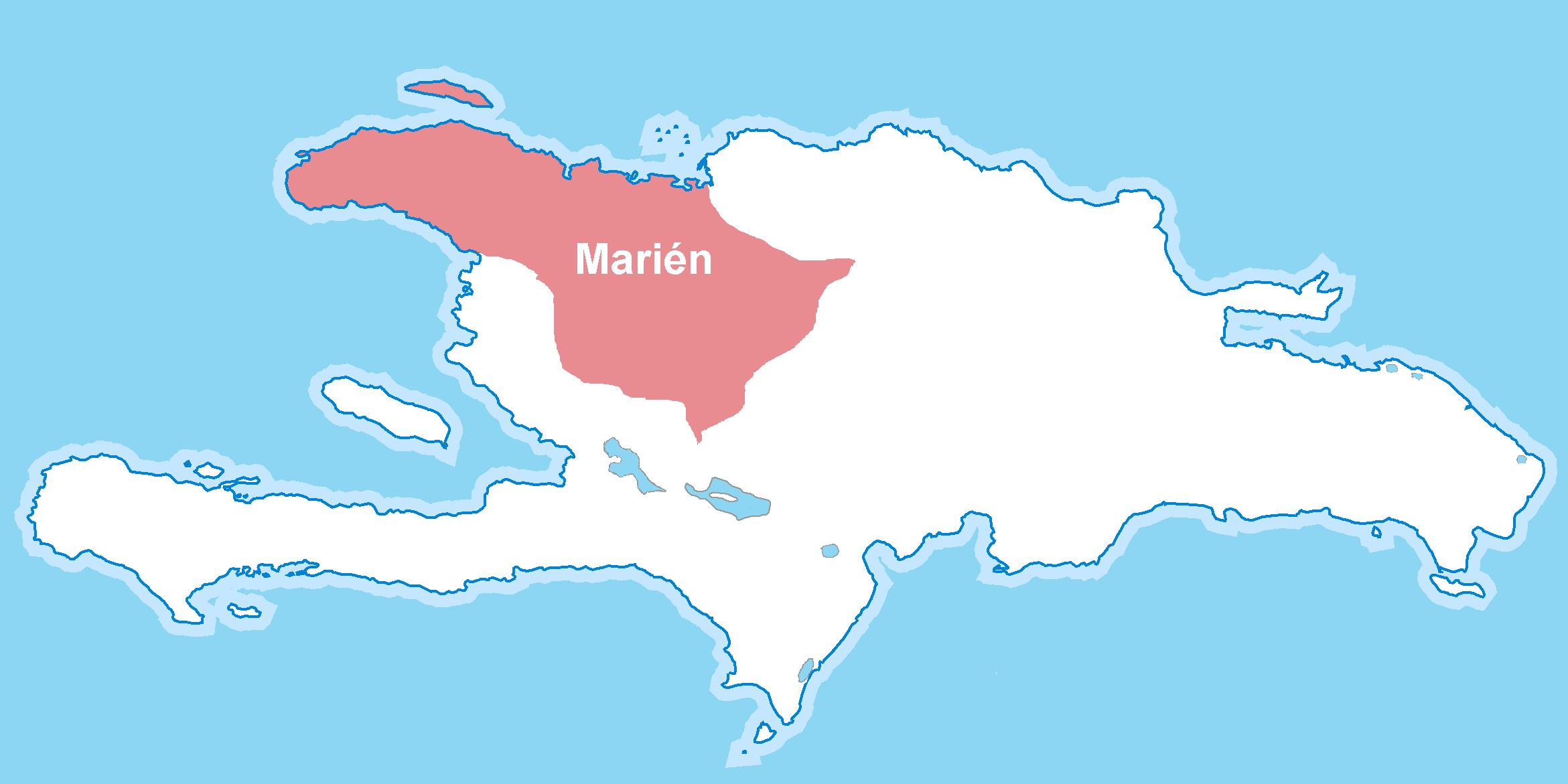
Cacique of Marién

The cacicazgo of Marién included the entire northwestern part of Quisqueya, bordered to the north by the Atlantic Ocean, the south by the cacicazgo of Jaragua, east by the cacicazgos of Maguá and Maguana, and west by the Windward Passage.

It was ruled by the cacique Guacanagaríx, with its capital located in El Guarico, near the present-day city of Cap-Haïtien. It was divided into 14 nitaínos. This cacicazgo was the first to accept Christopher Columbus and to convert to Christianity.

The cacicazgo of Marién fought against the cacicazgo Mairena, which was aided by Caonabo of the cacicazgo of Maguana for control of the mythical 'Mother' goddess Iermao. The 'Mother' Iermao was the goddess of the cacicazgo of Marién, which means "body stone".

=== Geographic scope ===
==== Dominican Republic ====
- Dajabón
- Monte Cristi
- Santiago Rodríguez
- Valverde

==== Haiti ====
- Artibonite
- Centre
- Nord-Est
- Nord-Ouest
- Nord

== Chiefdom of Maguá ==
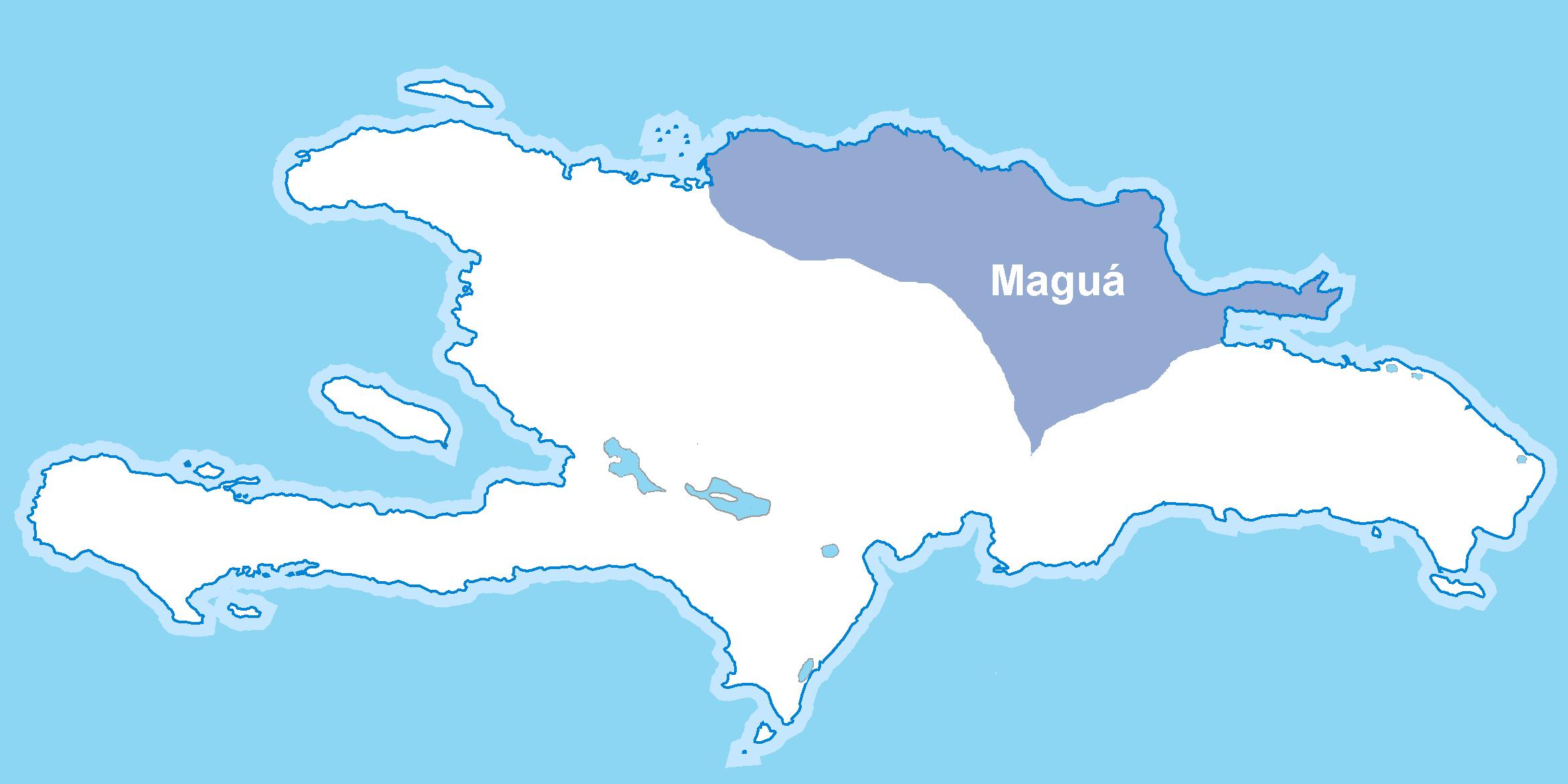
Chiefdom of Maguá

The cacicazgo of Maguá was located on the northeastern part of Hispaniola, bordered to the north and east by the Atlantic Ocean, the south by the cacicazgos of Maguana and Higüey, and west by the cacicazgos of Marién and Maguana. This chiefdom's territories are all in present-day Dominican Republic.

It was ruled by the cacique Guarionex and was centered near the present location of Santo Cerro in La Vega. It was divided into 21 nitaínos. This cacicazgo was one of the richest of the island.

The territory was also inhabited by an ethnically distinct group of natives called the Ciguayo, who were concentrated on the Samaná Peninsula. This group, who spoke the Ciguayo language, was absorbed into the cacicazgo of Maguá. This was noted by chronicler Bartolomé de las Casas, who wrote that in 1502 the language was on the decline and by 1527 extinct.

Maguá means "the Stone". The chiefdom's mother-goddess was Guacara or the 'Stone Mother'.

=== Geographic scope ===
==== Dominican Republic ====
- Duarte
- Espaillat
- La Vega
- María Trinidad Sánchez
- Monseñor Nouel
- Puerto Plata
- Hermanas Mirabal
- Samaná
- Sánchez Ramírez
- Santiago

== Chiefdom of Maguana ==
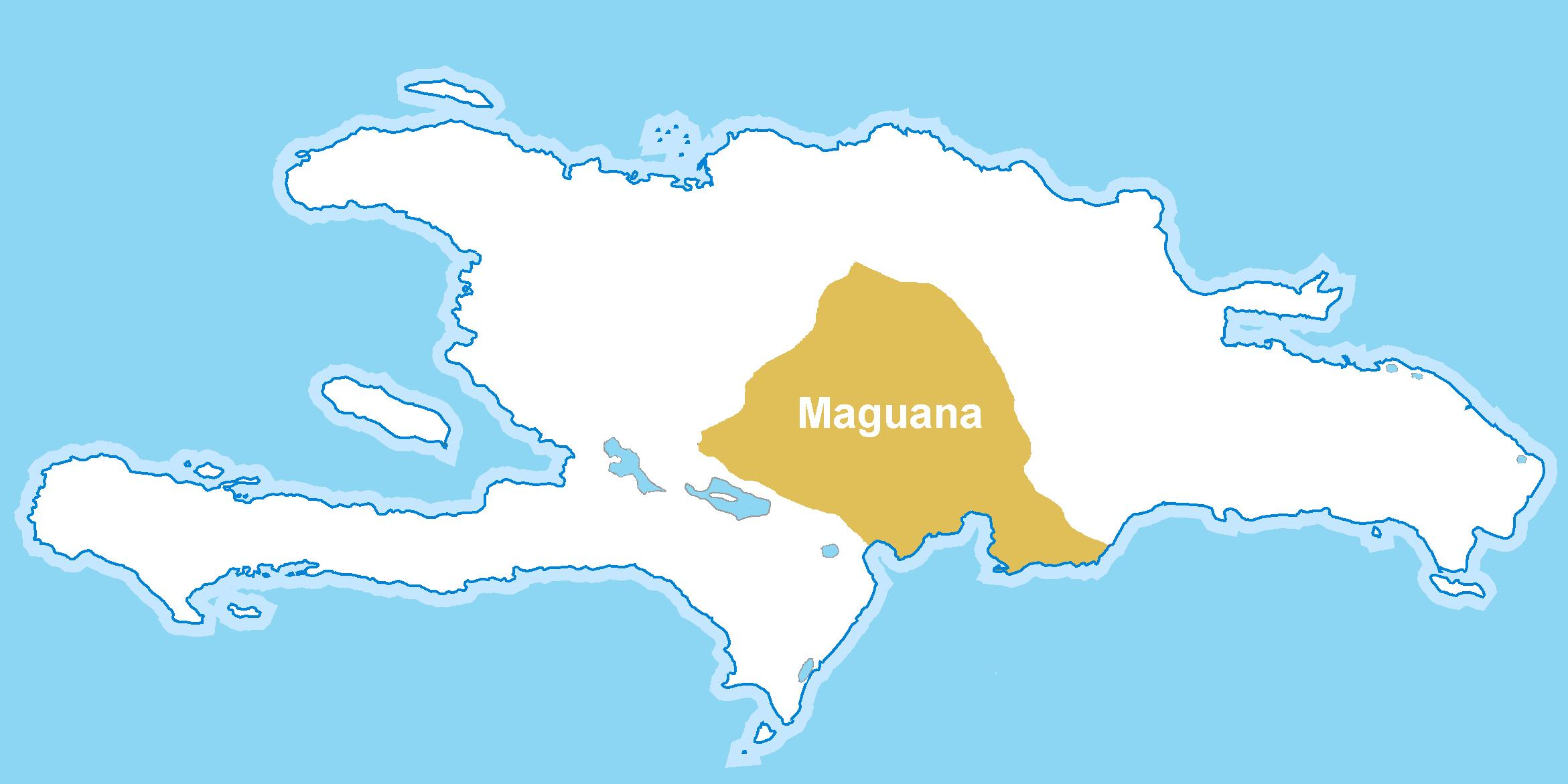
Cacique of Maguana

The cacicazgo of Maguana was located in the center of the island, bounded on the north by the cacicazgos of Marién and Maguá, south by the Caribbean, east by the cacicazgos of Maguá and Higüey, and west by the cacicazgos of Marién and Jaragua. This cacicazgos territories were all located in present-day Dominican Republic.

It was ruled by the cacique Caonabo, husband of Anacaona. Its center was established at Corral de los Indios located in the present day town of Juan de Herrera in San Juan province. It was divided into 21 nitaínos.

This was the principal cacicazgo of the island and was represented as "The Rock". The term Maguana means "the first stone" or "the only stone". The principal mother goddess of the chiefdom was Apito, which means "Mother of Stone".

The cacique Caonabo was the first to resist the Spanish occupation. The fort that Christopher Columbus established on the north coast of the island, La Navidad, was destroyed by Caonabo. Caonabo also attempted to sack Fortaleza de Santo Tomás, but was captured by Spanish forces led by commander Alonso de Ojeda. Instead of being condemned to death the cacique was sent to Spain to be paraded in front of the Royal Court but died on his voyage.

=== Geographic scope ===
==== Dominican Republic ====
- Azua
- Baoruco
- Elías Piña
- La Vega
- Peravia
- San Cristóbal
- San José de Ocoa
- San Juan
- Santiago

== Chiefdom of Jaragua ==
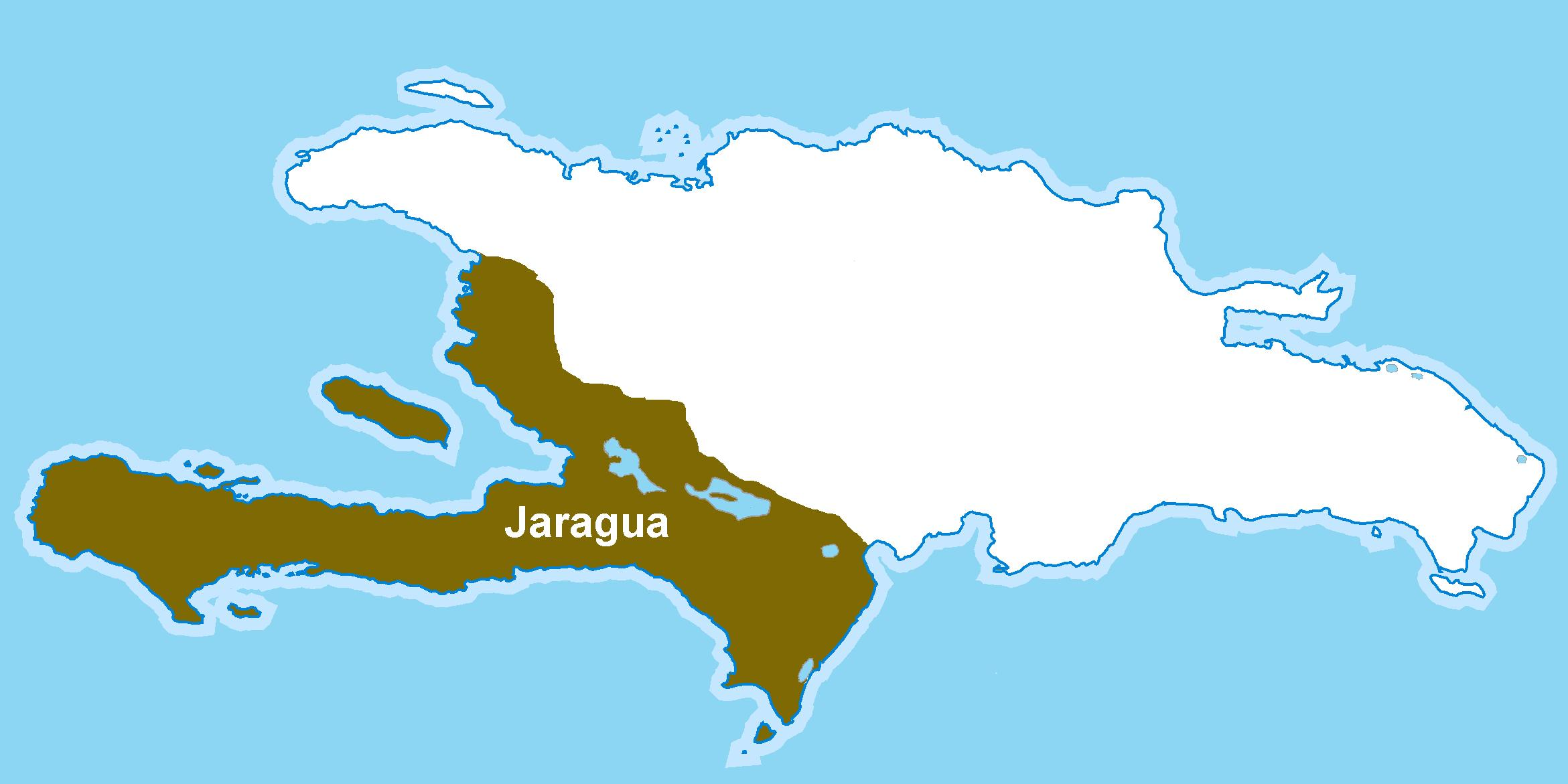
Chiefdom of Jaragua

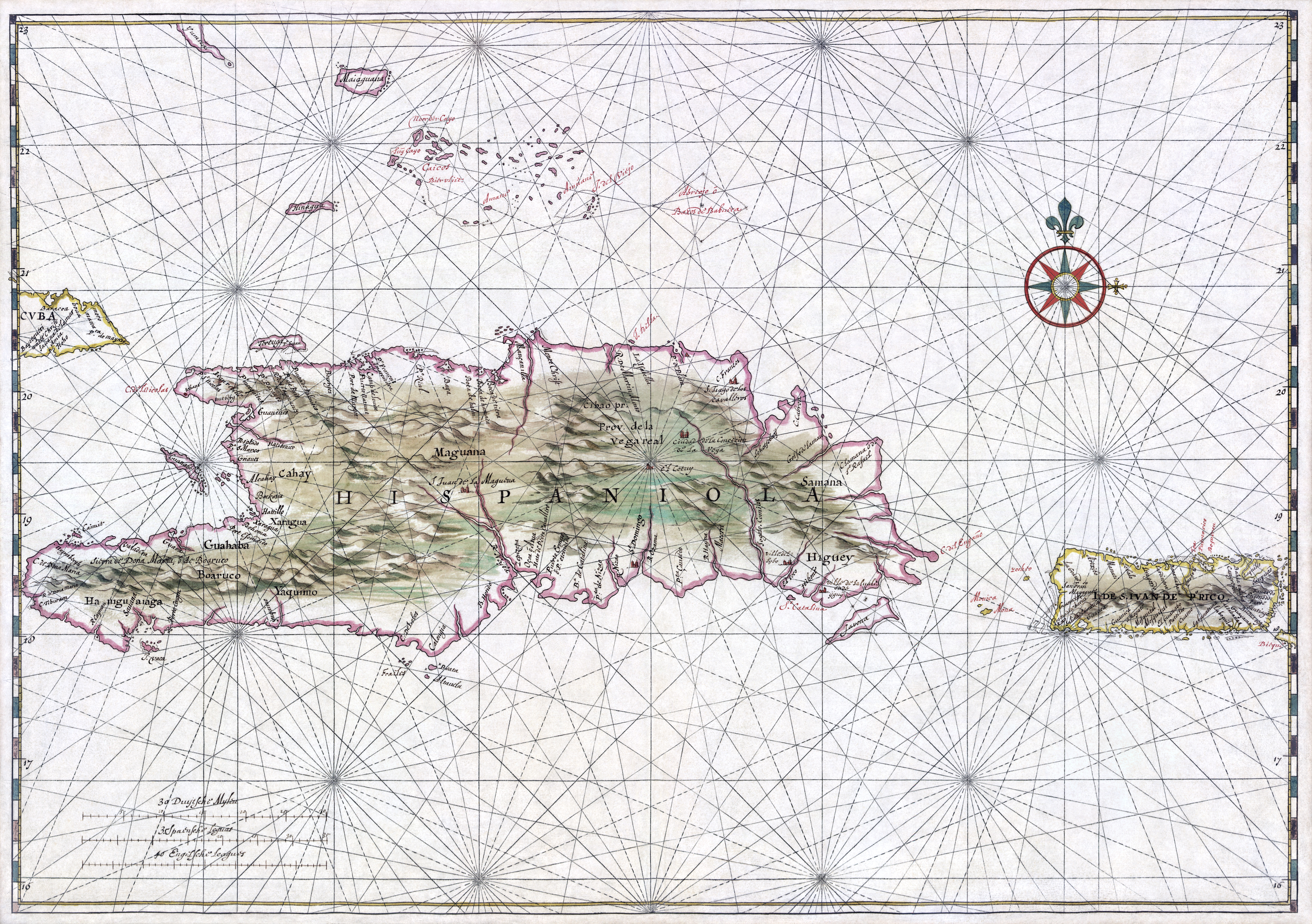
Old Map of Hispañola

The cacicazgo of Jaragua spanned the entire south-west of the island of Hispaniola. It was bordered on the north by the cacicazgo of Marién, south by the Caribbean Sea, east by the cacicazgo of Maguana, and west by the Jamaica Channel. It was ruled by the cacique Bohechío (cacique) (Beehechio) and was the largest of the cacicazgos. Its center was located in a place called Guava, present-day Léogâne in Haiti. It was divided into 26 nitaínos.

Bohechío was the brother of Anacaona, who was married to the cacique of Maguana; Caonabo. As such, Jaragua and Maguana had a strong alliance and would partner to ward off and attack rival cacicazgos.

The mother goddess of the cacicazgo was Zuimaco.

=== Geographic scope ===
==== Dominican Republic ====
- Baoruco
- Barahona
- Independencia
- Pedernales

==== Haiti ====
- Artibonite
- Grand'Anse
- Nippes
- Ouest
- Sud
- Sud-Est

== Chiefdom of Higüey ==
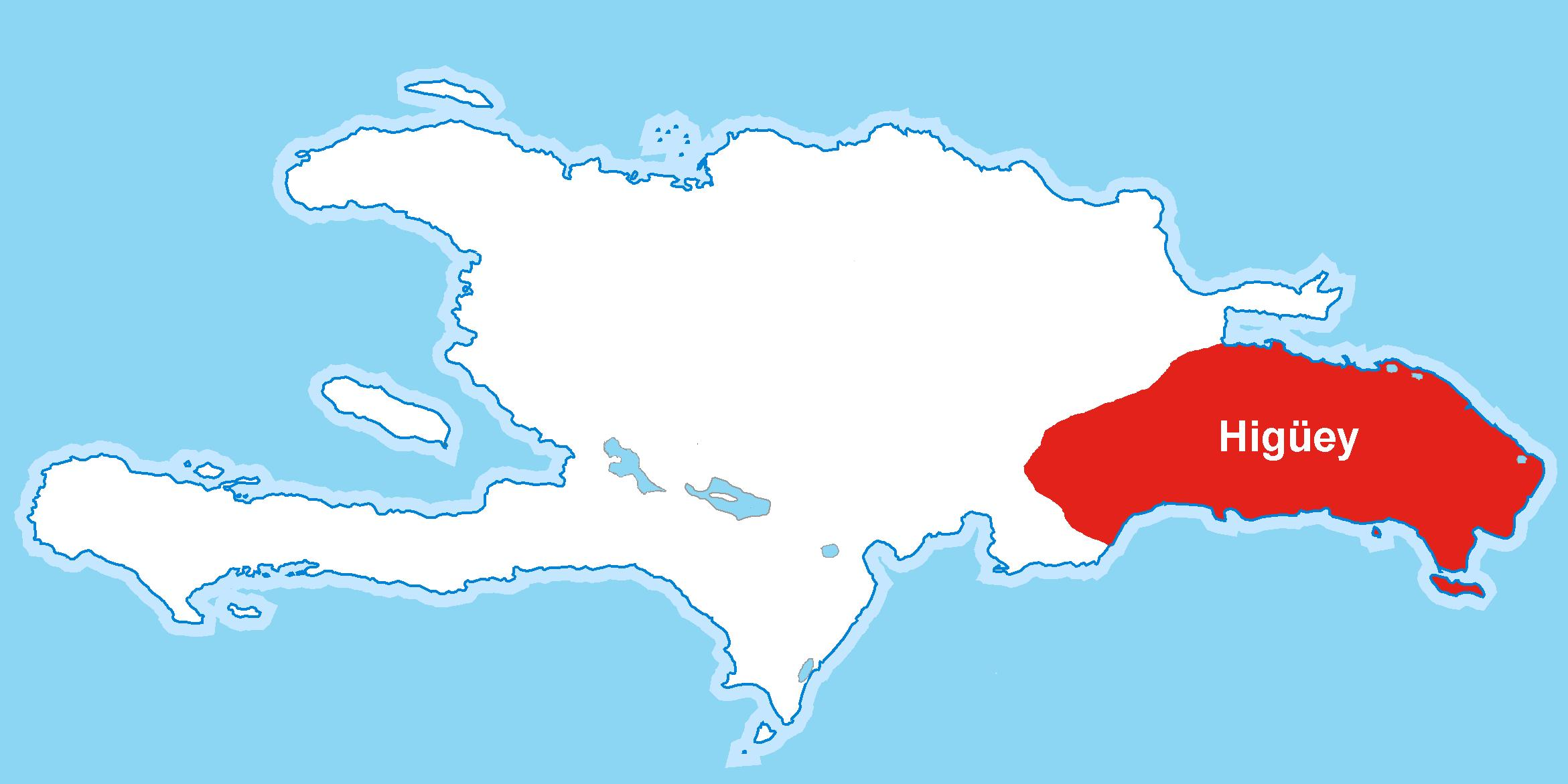
Chiefdom of Higüey

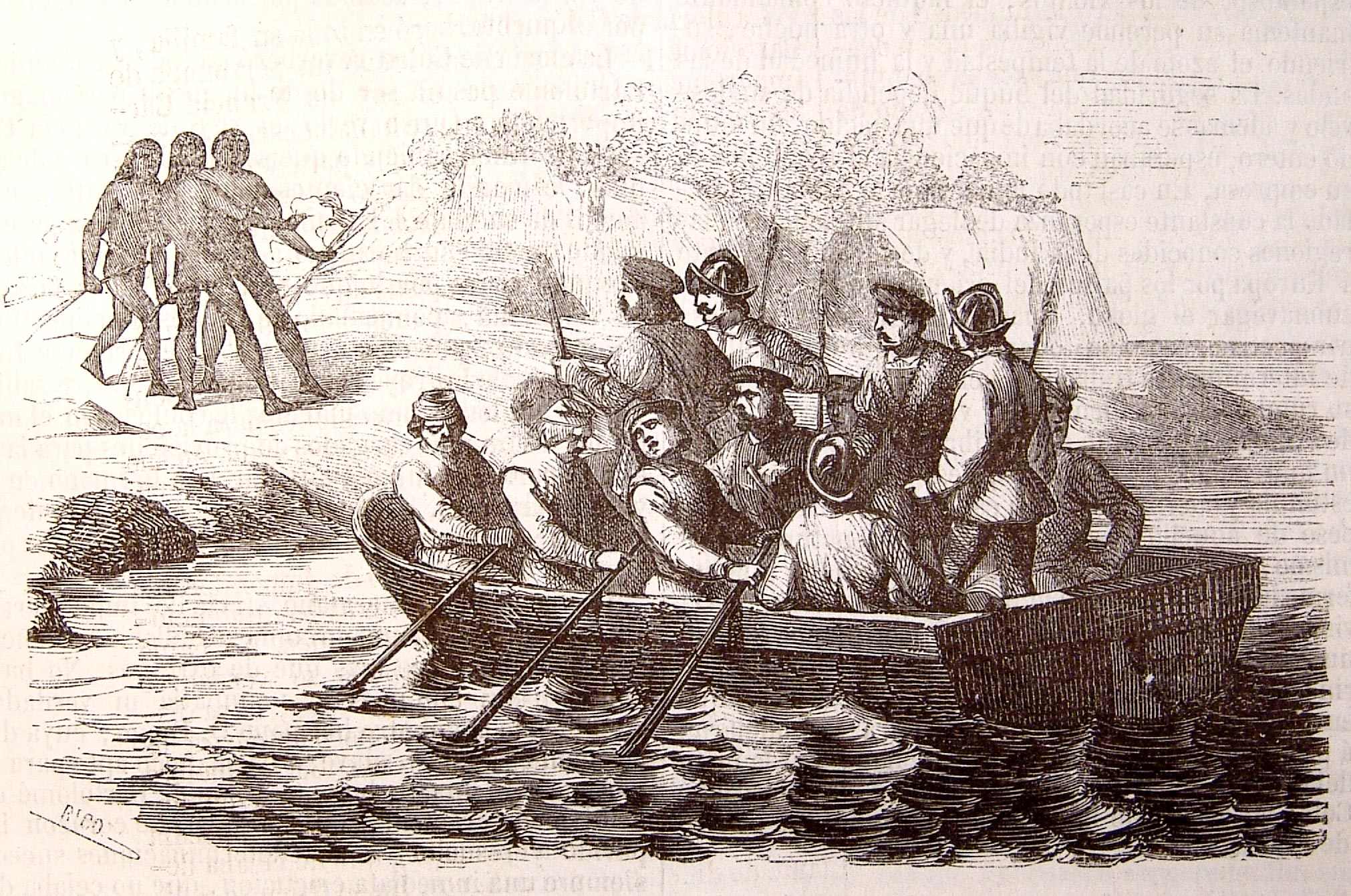
Christopher Columbus travelling to Higüey.

The cacicazgo of Higüey spanned the entire southeast of Hispaniola, bordered to the north by the cacicazgo of Maguá and the Samaná Bay, south by the Caribbean, east by the Canal de la Mona, and west by the cacicazgo of Maguana. It was ruled by the cacique Cayacoa and was divided into 21 nitaínos. The capital of the cacicazgo was located in present-day Higüey.

Floyd states Cotubanama was the cacique of Higüey, who was captured by Juan de Esquivel and hanged in Santo Domingo.

The mother goddess of Higüey was Atabeira, which means "Mother of the original stone".

=== Geographic scope ===
==== Dominican Republic ====
- Distrito Nacional
- El Seibo
- Hato Mayor
- La Altagracia
- La Romana
- Monte Plata
- San Pedro de Macorís
- Santo Domingo

Chronology of Hispaniola
Previous	Current	Next
Pre-Columbian era	Taíno chiefdoms	Spanish penetration into the Island
