= Indigenous peoples of the Caribbean =

First human inhabitants of the Caribbean

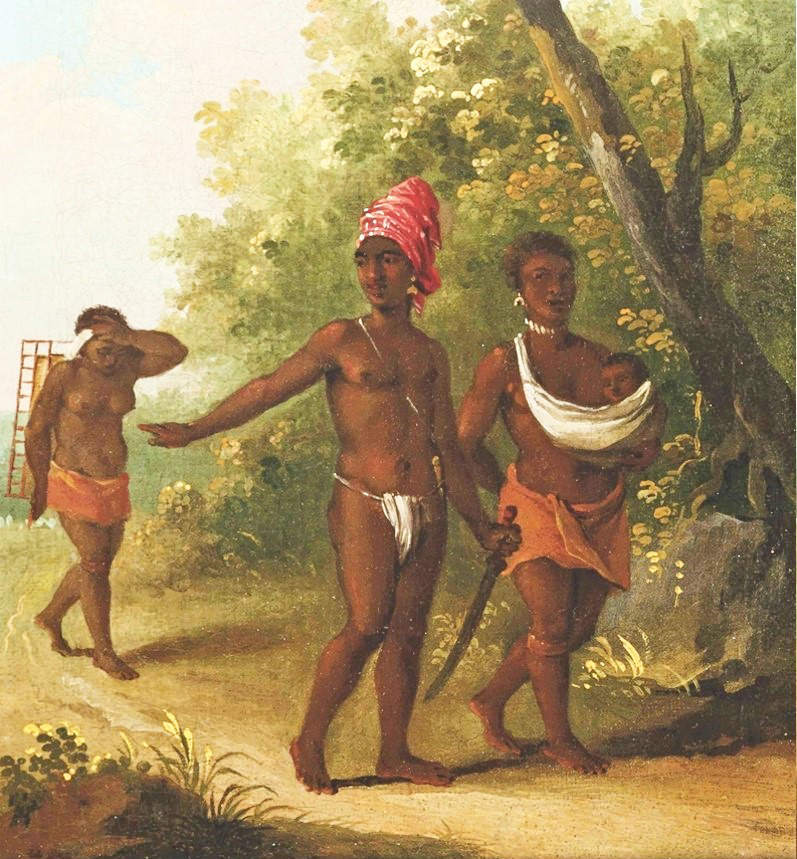
Painting of a Carib family from Saint Vincent

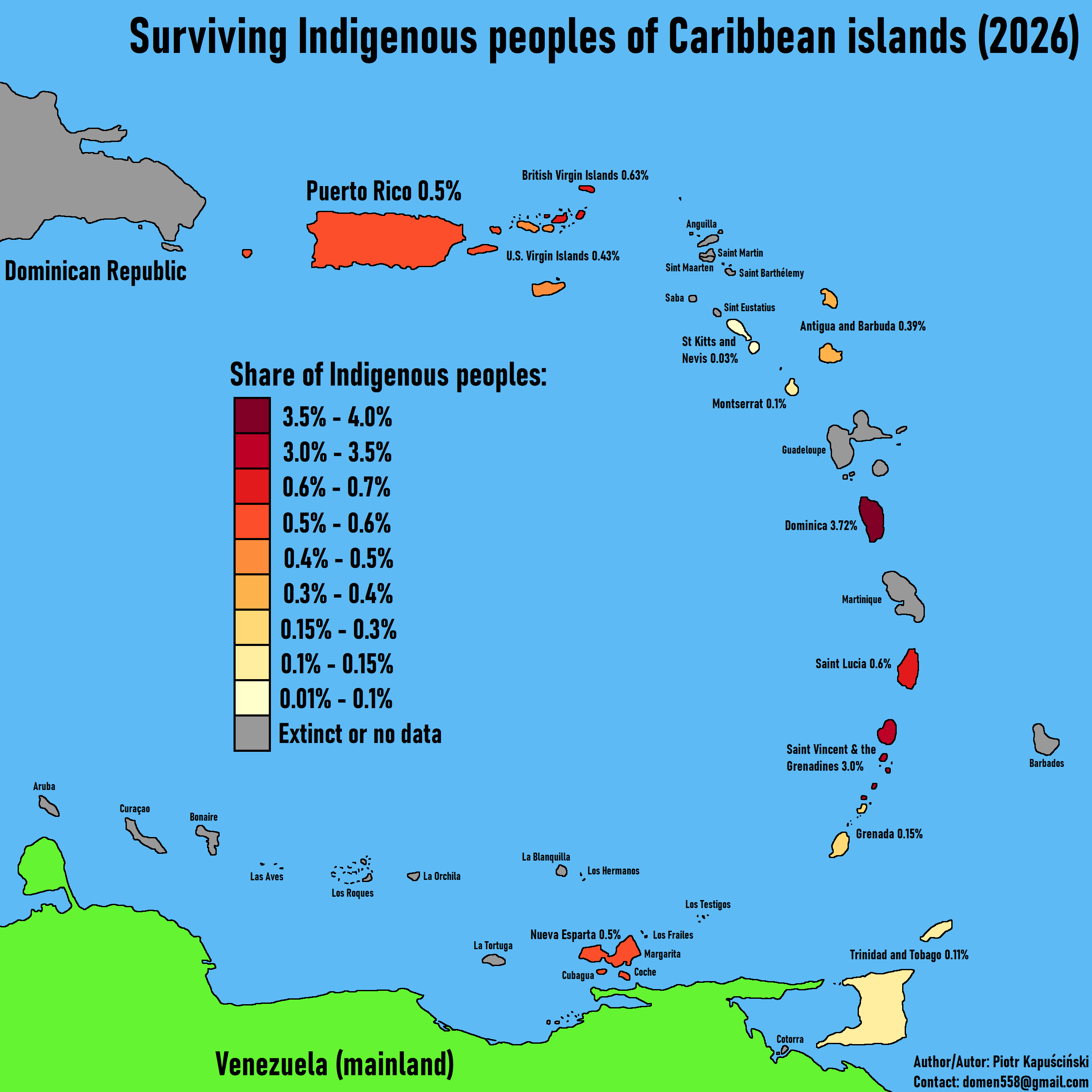
Surviving Indigenous peoples of Caribbean islands as of 2026

At the time of first contact between Europe and the Americas, the Indigenous peoples of the Caribbean included the Taíno of the northern Lesser Antilles and most of the Greater Antilles, including the Lucayans of the Bahamas and the Ciboney of Cuba; the Kalinago of the Lesser Antilles; the Ciguayo and Macorix of parts of Hispaniola; and the Guanahatabey of western Cuba. The Kalinago have maintained an identity as an Indigenous people, with a reserved territory in Dominica.

== Introduction ==
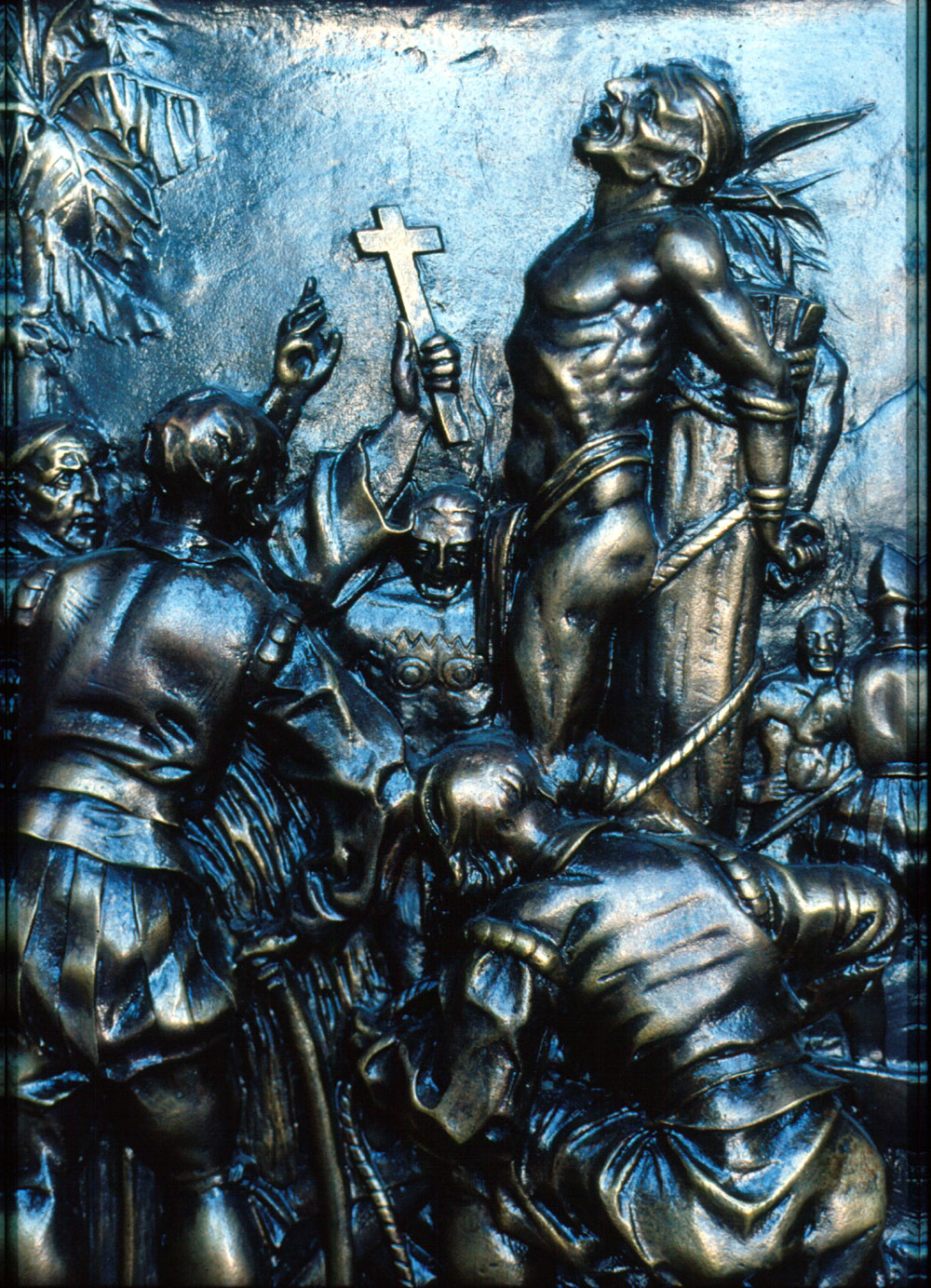
Burning of Hatuey, a Taíno chieftain. From a bas-relief of the portal of El Capitolio of Havana

Some scholars consider it important to distinguish the Taíno from the neo-Taíno nations of Cuba, Puerto Rico, and Hispaniola, and the Lucayan of the Bahamas and Jamaica. Linguistically or culturally these differences extended from various cognates or types of canoe: canoa, piragua, cayuco to distinct languages. Languages diverged even over short distances. Previously these groups often had distinctly non-Taíno deities such as the goddess Jagua. Strangely enough the god Teju Jagua is a major demon of Indigenous Paraguayan mythology. Still these groups plus the high Taíno are considered Island Arawak, part of a widely diffused assimilating culture, a circumstance witnessed even today by names of places in the New World; for example localities or rivers called Guamá are found in Cuba, Venezuela and Brazil. Guamá was the name of famous Taíno who fought the Spanish.

Thus, since the neo-Taíno had far more diverse cultural input and a greater societal and ethnic heterogeneity than the true high Taíno (Rouse, 1992). Boriquen (Puerto Rico) is presented in a separate section. A broader language group is Arawakan languages. The term Arawak (Aruaco) is said to be derived from an insulting term meaning "eaters of meal" given to them by mainland Caribs. In turn the Arawak legend explains the origin of the Caribs as offspring of a putrid serpent.

The social classes of the neo-Taíno, generalized from Bartolomé de las Casas, appeared to have been loosely feudal with the following Taíno classes: naboría (common people), nitaíno' (sub-chiefs, or nobles), bohique, (shamans priests/healers), and the cacique (chieftains, or princes). However, the neo-Taíno seem to have been more relaxed in this respect.

== Administrative and national units ==
The Spanish found that most Cuban peoples for the part living peacefully in tidy towns and villages grouped into numerous principalities called cacicazgos or principalities with an almost feudal social structure. They were ruled by leaders or princes, called Caciques. Cuba was divided into Guanahatabey, Ciboney, and the Classical Taíno, some of whom began arriving from Hispaniola around 1450 and many more of whom fled to Cuba from Hispaniola after the arrival of the Spanish. Then some of Western Cuba was Guanahatabey. and some Ciboney. Taíno-like cultures controlled most of Cuba dividing it into the cacicazgos. Granberry and Vescelius (2004) and other contemporary authors only consider the cazicazgo of Baracoa as classical or high Taíno. Cuban cacicazgos including Bayaquitiri, Macaca, Bayamo, Camagüey, Jagua, Habana y Haniguanica are treated here as "neo-Taíno". Hispaniolan principalities at about 1500 included Maguá (Cacique Guarionex); Xaraguá (Behecchio); Maguana (Caonabo); Higüey also called Iguayagua (Higüayo); Cigüayo (Mayobanex), and Marien under Cacique Guanacagarí (Wilson, 1990). These principalities are considered to have various affinities to the contemporary Taíno and neo-Taíno cultures from what is now known as Puerto Rico and the Dominican Republic and Haiti, but are generally believed somewhat different.

== Farming and fishing ==
The adroit farming and fishing skills of the neo-Taíno nations should not be underestimated; the names of fauna and flora that survive today are testimony of their continued use. Neo-Taíno fishing technologies were most inventive, including harpoons and fishnets and traps. Neo-Taíno common names of fish are still used today (DeSola, 1932; Erdman, 1983; Florida Fish and Wild Life Commission (Division of Marine Fisheries) 2002; Puerto Rico, Commonwealth, 1998). Agriculture included a wide variety of germplasm, including maize, peanuts, tomato, squash, and beans plus a vast array of tree fruits. Tubers in most frequent use were yuca (Manihot esculenta) a crop with perhaps 10,000 years of development in the Americas; boniato (the "sweet potato" — Ipomoea batatas), and malanga (Xanthosoma sp.)

== Pharmacopoeia ==
As with all Arawak (Schultes, Raffault. 1990) and similar cultures there was considerable use of natural pharmacopoeia among the Taíno (Robineau, 1991).

== Taíno studies ==
Taíno studies are in a state of both vigorous revival and conflict (Haslip-Viera, 2001). In this conflict deeply embedded cultural mores, senses of nationality and ethnicity struggle with each other. The Syboneistas undertook studies and wrote of neo-Taínos as part and cover for independence struggles against Spain (Fajardo, 1829 - c. 1862; Gautier Benítez, 1873).

== Indigenous and Taíno art ==
Taíno and related art has been celebrated in several significant exhibitions (Alegria, and Arrom 1998; Bercht, et al. 1997; Bullen, Dacal et al.; Kerchache, 1994), most notably in Paris. Neo-Taíno music (areíto) survives as echoes in the rich traditions of the popular music of the Caribbean, but is believed to continue to exist in its purest form and associated spirituality among the Warao of Venezuela.

== Metallurgy ==
The art of the neo-Taínos demonstrates that these nations had metallurgical skills, and it has been postulated by some e.g. Paul Sidney Martin, that the inhabitants of these islands mined and exported metals such as copper (Martin et al. 1947). The Cuban town of (San Ramón de) Guaninao means the place of copper and is surmised to have been a site of pre-Columbian mining.

== Peoples of the Caribbean ==
=== Archaic Age people ===
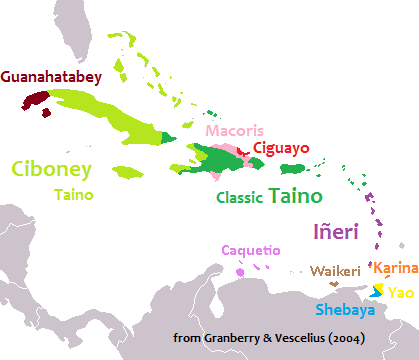
Peoples of the Caribbean at the time of European contact. Chartreuse, green and purple are Awawakan; orange and yellow Cariban. Brown, pink and red were the remaining archaic peoples.

DNA studies changed some of the traditional beliefs about pre-Columbian Indigenous history. According to National Geographic, "studies confirm that a wave of pottery-making farmers—known as Ceramic Age people—set out in canoes from the northeastern coast of South America starting some 2,500 years ago and island-hopped across the Caribbean. They were not, however, the first colonizers. On many islands they encountered a foraging people who arrived some 6,000 or 7,000 years ago...The ceramicists, who are related to today's Arawak-speaking peoples, supplanted the earlier foraging inhabitants—presumably through disease or violence—as they settled new islands."

=== Taíno ===
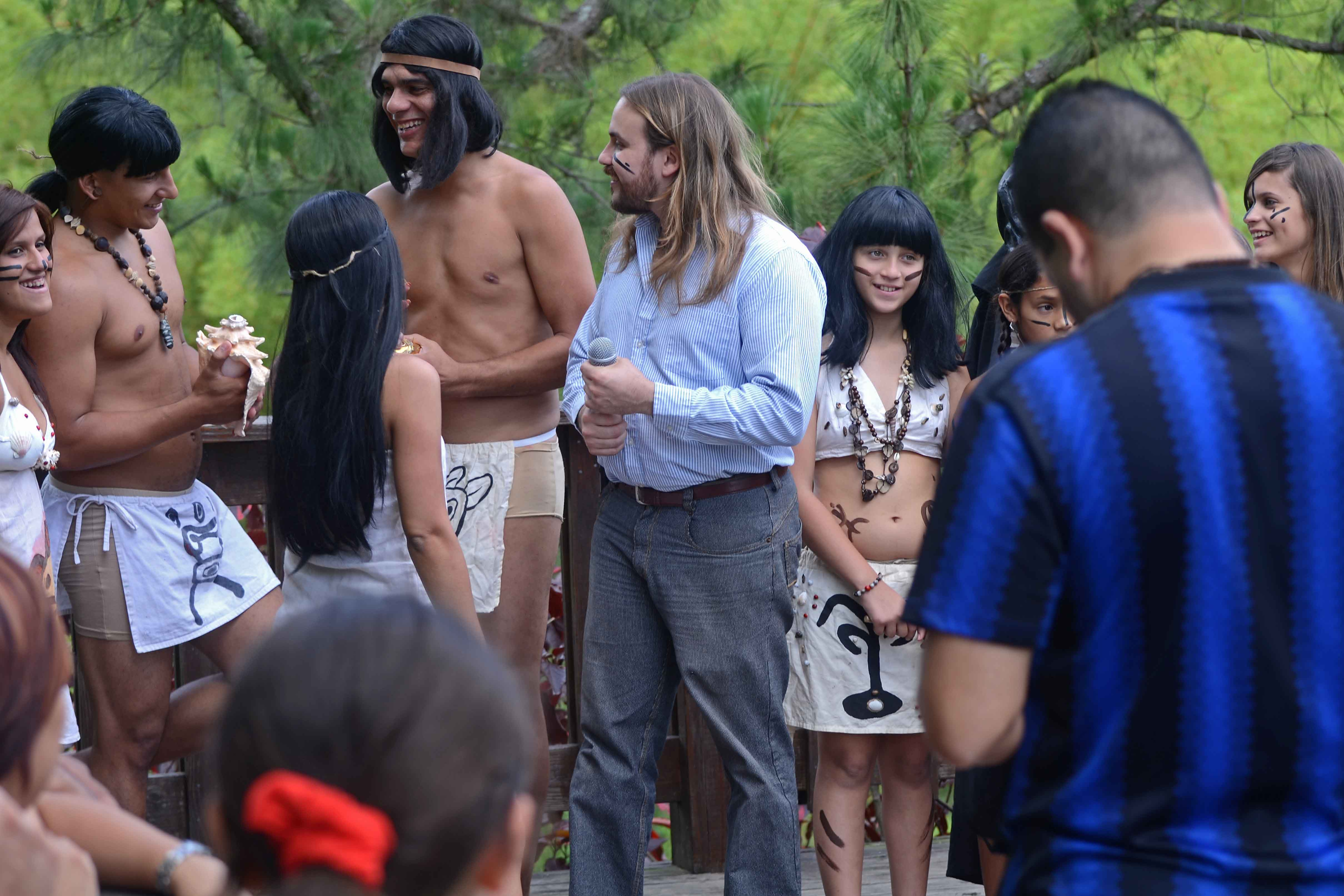
Taíno reenactment in Puerto Rico

The Taíno, an Arawak people, were the major population group throughout most of the Caribbean. Their culture was divided into three main groups, the Western Taíno, the Classic Taíno, and the Eastern Taíno, with other variations within the islands.

==== Classic Taíno ====
The Classic Taíno lived in Hispaniola and Puerto Rico and later in eastern Cuba. They spoke a dialect called Classic Taíno. Compared to their neighbors, the Classic Taíno had substantially developed agricultural societies. Puerto Rico was divided into twenty chiefdoms which were organized into one united kingdom or confederation, Borinquen. Hispaniola was divided into roughly 45 chiefdoms, which were organized into five kingdoms under the leadership of the chief of each area's premier chiefdom. Beginning around 1450, Classic Taíno from Hispaniola began migrating to eastern Cuba; they are conventionally known as the Cuban Taíno. The Cuban Taíno gained power over some of Cuba's earlier Western Taíno inhabitants, the Ciboney, but no regional or island-wide political structure had developed on the island at the time of Spanish colonization of the Americas.

==== Eastern Taíno ====
The Eastern Taíno inhabited the Leeward Islands of the Lesser Antilles, from the Virgin Islands to Montserrat. They had less sophisticated societies than the Classic Taíno.

==== Western Taíno ====
The Western Taíno lived in The Bahamas, central Cuba, westernmost Hispaniola, and Jamaica. They spoke a dialect known as Ciboney or Western Taíno. The Western Taíno of the Bahamas were known as the Lucayans and spoke the Lucayan language; they were wiped out by Spanish slave raids by 1520. Western Taíno living in Cuba were known as the Ciboney. They had no chiefdoms or organized political structure beyond individual villages, but by the time of Spanish conquest many were under the control of the Cuban Taíno in eastern Cuba.

=== Igneri ===
According to oral history, the Igneri were the original Arawak inhabitants of the Windward Islands in the Lesser Antilles before being conquered by the Kalinago who are thought to have arrived from South America. Contemporary sources like to suggest that the Kalinago took Igneri women as their wives while killing the men, resulting in the two sexes speaking different languages. This is not proven, and there appears to be a confusion of the reality: despite the name, the Kalinago language was Arawakan, not Cariban. Irving Rouse suggests that small numbers of Kalinago may have conquered the Igneri without displacing them, and could have gradually adopted their language while retaining the Kalinago identity, but there is no evidence to prove this. Though they were Arawaks, the Igneri language appears to be as distinct from the Taíno language as it was from the mainland Arawak language of South America.

=== Kalinago ===
By the contact period, the Kalinago, also known as Island Caribs, inhabited the Windward Islands of the Lesser Antilles. "Caribbean" derives from the name "Carib", by which the Kalinago were formerly known. They self-identified with the Kalina or mainland Carib people of South America. Contemporary accounts asserted that the Kalinago had conquered the Windward Islands from their previous inhabitants, the Igneri. However, the Kalinago language was Arawakan, not Cariban. Irving Rouse suggests that small numbers of South American Caribs invaded the Windwards and conquered the Igneri without displacing them; they gradually adopted the local language while maintaining the Kalinago identity. The Kalinago continue to live in the Lesser Antilles in the Caribbean. Noteworthy Kalinago descendants live on within the Garifuna people, known as the Black Caribs who descend from St. Vincent in the Lesser Antilles.

While various Indigenous peoples of the Lesser Antilles are sometimes referred to as "Kalinago" because that is the preferred terminology of certain Indigenous communities in Dominica and Saint Vincent and the Grenadines, it may not be accurate to refer to all of the Indigenous peoples of the Lesser Antilles throughout history as "Kalinago".

=== Guanahatabey ===
A separate ethnic identity from far western Cuba. They were an archaic hunter-gatherer people who spoke a language distinct from Taíno, and appear to have predated the agricultural, Taíno-speaking Ciboney.

=== Ciguayo ===
A separate ethnic people that inhabited the Peninsula of Samaná and part of the northern coast toward Nagua in what today is the Dominican Republic, and, by most contemporary accounts, differed in language and customs from the classical or high Taíno who lived on the eastern part of the island of Hispaniola then known. According to Eustaquio Fernandez de Navarrete, they were "warriors and spirited people," ("gente animosa y guerrera"). The Cronista de Indias, Pedro Martir accused them of cannibalism: "when they descend from the mountains to wage war on their neighbors, they kill and eat some of them" ("trae[n] origen de los caníbales, pues cuando de las montañas bajan a lo llano para hacer guerra á sus vecinos, si matan á algunos se los comen"). Fray Ramón Pané, often dubbed as the first anthropologist of the Caribbean, distinguished the Ciguayo language from the rest of those spoken on Hispaniola. Bartolomé de las Casas, who studied them and was one of the few who read Ramón Pané's original work in Spanish, provided most of the documentation about this group in his work Historia de Las Indias. Linguists Julian Granberry and Gary Vescelius believe that the Cigüayos emigrated from Central America. Wilson (1990) states that c. 1500 this was the kingdom Cacicazgo of Cacique Guacangarí.

=== Macorix ===
Another separate ethnic group that lived on the eastern side of the island of Hispaniola. Their region today is in the Dominican Republic. According to las Casas, their language was unintelligible for the Xaraguá, but may have been similar to the Ciguayo language.(Wilson, 1990)

"There were three distinct languages in this island, unintelligible to each other; one was the people we called of lower Macorix, and the other were the neighbors from upper Macorix" (Tres lenguas habia en esta Isla distintas, que la una á la otra no se entendia; la una era de la gente que llamábamos del Macoríx de abajo, y la otra de los vecinos del Macoríx de arriba).

— Bartolomé de las Casas

Recent studies show that the Macorix people coexisted with the Taínos on Hispaniola. The names San Francisco de Macorix and San Pedro de Macorix in the Dominican Republic are indirect references to the political divisions of the cacicazgo. The Spaniards wrongly assumed that the names given to the different territories were a reference "to what they called a Cacicazgo:

a region dominated by a cacique. Cacique comes from the Taíno word kassiquan, meaning 'to keep house,' or meaning: 'a lord, dominating a great territory.' The different names given by the five regions in reality was given by the Indigenous people based on the various Indigenous groups living on those areas.

— Federico djs Amador

=== Florida tribes ===
The Tequesta of the southeast coast of the Florida peninsula were once considered to be related to the Taíno, but most anthropologists now doubt this. The Tequesta had been present in the area for at least 2,000 years at the time of first European contact, and are believed to have built the Miami Stone Circle. Carl O. Sauer called the Florida Straits "one of the most strongly marked cultural boundaries in the New World", noting that the Straits were also a boundary between agricultural systems, with Florida Indians growing seed crops that originated in Mexico, while the Lucayans of the Bahamas grew root crops that originated in South America.

It is possible that a few Lucayas reached Florida shortly before the first European contacts in the area, but the northwestern Bahamas had remained uninhabited until approximately 1200, and the long established presence of the existing tribes in Florida would have likely prevented any pioneering settlements by people who had only just reached the neighboring islands. Analysis of ocean currents and weather patterns indicates that people traveling by canoe from the Bahamas to Florida were likely to land in northern Florida rather than closer to the Bahamas. A single 'Antillean axe head' found near Gainesville, Florida may support some limited contacts. Due to the same ocean currents, direct travel in canoes from southern Florida to the Bahamas was unlikely.

=== Ciboney ===
Contemporary knowledge of the Cuban Indigenous cultures which are often, but less precisely, lumped into a category called Taíno by some modern anthropologists, comes from early Spanish sources, oral traditions and considerable archaeological evidence. The Spanish found that most Cuban peoples were, for the most part, living peacefully in tidy towns and villages grouped into numerous principalities called Cacicazgos with an almost feudal social structure (see Bartolomé de las Casas). They were ruled by leaders called Caciques. Cuba was divided into Guanahatabey, Ciboney (also Siboney), and Classical (High) Taíno. Some of western Cuba was Guanahatabey and some Siboney (see below).

Taíno-like cultures controlled most of Cuba, dividing it into cacicazgos or principalities. Granberry, Vescelius (2004), and other contemporary authors only consider the cacicazgo of Baracoa as Classical or High Taíno. Cuban cacicazgos including Bayaquitiri, Macaca, Bayamo, Camagüey, Jagua, Habana y Haniguanica are considered neo-Taíno. These principalities are considered to have various affinities to contemporary neo-Taíno cultures from Puerto Rico and Hispaniola, but are generally believed to have been somewhat different.

The archaeologist L Antonio Curet has questioned whether the Ciboney people should be referred to as Taínos, writing that "Despite its widespread use in academic and popular publications, the use of the term Taíno has not gone without criticism or opposition" and that academics since the 1800s have been "criticizing its use and questioning its scientific basis and value and suggested using instead names such as siboneyes, haytianos, jamaiquinos, and borinqueños that were more related to actual terms used by the natives to refer to the islands."

== Ethnic/cultural derivatives ==
=== Guajiros and Jibaros ===
The common name given to the rural inhabitants of Cuba is guajiros. Del Campo implies that quajiros are "native-born whites" and states that in Puerto Rico "the influence of the Indigenous population is more marked than that of the native populations in Cuba".

== Wayuu people ==
The Wayuu, also known as the Guajira/Guajiro, are an indigenous Arawakan-speaking people of the Guajira Peninsula between Venezuela and Colombia. For a small compendium of myths of this people please see:

- de Cora, Maria Manuela 1972. Kuai-Mare. Mitos Aborígenes de Venezuela. Monte Avila Editores Caracas.

== Later nations in this general area ==
Arawakan-speaking peoples, including the Kalinago and the Kalina, as well as other peoples of the Mesoamerican coast and the Amazon, can be considered as part of a tenuous continuum of nations, linked by some shared vocabulary, ethnic links, agricultural practices, reinforced by bride abduction, and continuous exogamy. After the violence of the Spanish conquest, and subsequent events of African slavery and rebellion, nations and cultures with diverse amounts of Arawakan-speaking ethnicity, culture, and/or traditions transmuted and arose.

== See also ==
- Indigenous peoples of Cuba
- Indigenous peoples of the Americas
- Indigenous peoples in Guyana
- Indigenous peoples in Suriname
- Indigenous peoples in French Guiana
- Mayan peoples
- Arawak
- Arawakan languages
- Cariban languages
- Indigenous peoples of Grenada
- Languages of the Caribbean
  - Indigenous languages of the Caribbean
- Garifuna people
- Genetic history of Indigenous peoples of the Americas
- Igneri
- Indigenous peoples of Florida
- Indigenous peoples in Venezuela
- Kalinago
- List of Spanish words of Indigenous American Indian origin
- Influx of disease in the Caribbean
- Pre-Columbian Antigua and Barbuda
- Taíno
