= Macorix language =

Extinct language of Hispaniola

Macorix
- Mazorij
- Native to: Dominican Republic, possibly neighboring Haiti
- Region: Northern and eastern coast, bordering the Peninsula of Samaná, and across the island to the southern coast; Pedernales Peninsula.
- Ethnicity: Macorix
- Extinct: 16th century
- Language family: unclassified
- Dialects: Upper; Lower

Language codes
- ISO 639-3: None (mis)
- Glottolog: None
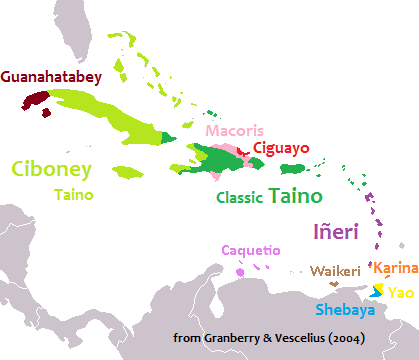
- Precolombian languages of the Antilles. Macorix Ciboney Taíno, Classic Taíno and Iñeri were Arawakan, Kariʼna and Yao were Cariban. Guanahatabey, Ciguayo, and Macorix are unclassified.

Macorix (also spelled Maçorís or Mazorij) was the Indigenous language of the northern coast of the island of Hispaniola, in present day Dominican Republic. Spanish accounts only refer to three languages on the island: the Xaraguá dialect of Taíno, Macorix, and neighboring Ciguayo. The Macorix people appear to have been semi-sedentary and their presence seems to have predated the agricultural Taíno who came to occupy much of the island. For the early European writers, they shared similarities with the nearby Ciguayos. Their language appears to have been moribund at the time of the Spanish Conquest, and within a century it was extinct.

== Name ==
The name Macorix is a Taíno exonym meaning 'unfriendly people' (cf. Maku used by other Arawakan-speaking peoples to designate the same meaning).

== Dialects ==
Upper Macoris was spoken on the north-central coast of the Roman Catholic Diocese of Magua from Puerto Plata to Nagua, and inland to San Francisco de Macorís and further. It was also distributed on the southeast coast of Hispaniola around San Pedro de Macorís.

Lower Macoris was spoken in the northwestern part of the Roman Catholic Diocese of Magua from Monte Cristi to Puerto Plata, and from the coast inland to the area of Santiago de los Caballeros.

== Lexicon ==
Little is known of Macorix apart from it being a distinct language from Taino and neighboring Ciguayo. A negative form, baeza [baˈesa], is the only element of the language that is directly attested. Baeza could be Arawakan (though not Taino or Iñeri), analyzable as ba-ésa 'no-thing' = 'nothing'. (Cf. Manao ma-esa 'no, not', Paresis ma-isa 'not'. The negative prefix is ba- in Amarakaeri which, even if it is related to the Arawakan languages, is not close enough to be relevant here.)

=== Toponyms ===
There are also some non-Taino toponyms from the area that Granberry & Vescelius (2004) suggest may be Waroid:

Possible Macorix toponyms
Name	Warao parallel	Warao meaning
Baho (river)	baho-ro	'shroud, dense (forest)'
Bahoruco (region)	baho-ro-eku	'within the forest'
Mana (river)	mana	'two, double'
Haina (river)	ha-ina	'many nets'
Saona (island)	sa-ona	'full of bats'

(Cf. a similar list at Guanahatabey language.)

== See also ==
- Indigenous languages of the Caribbean
