= Macorix =

Macorix may refer to:

- The Macorix people, a Indigenous people what is now the Dominican Republic
  - Macorix language
- Macorix (RM-21), a Dominican Navy tug in commission from 1972 to 1986 which previously had served in the United States Navy as USS Kiowa (ATF-72)
