= Ciguayo language =

Extinct language of the Dominican Republic

Ciguayo
- Siwayo
- Native to: Dominican Republic
- Region: Samaná Peninsula
- Ethnicity: Ciguayos
- Extinct: 16th century
- Language family: unclassified

Language codes
- ISO 639-3: None (mis)
- Linguist List: 0yv
- Glottolog: None
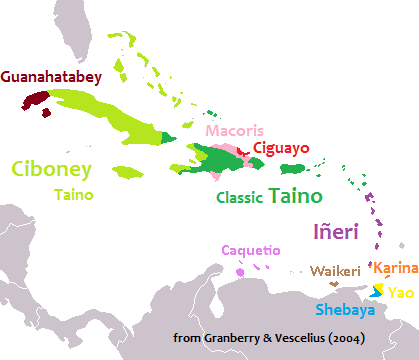
- Precolombian languages of the Antilles, according to Granberry and Vescelius. Ciguayo Ciboney Taíno, Classic Taíno, Iñeri, and Shebaya were Arawakan, Kariʼna and Yao were Cariban. Guanahatabey, Macorix, and Ciguayo are unclassified.

Ciguayo (Siwayo) was the language of the Samaná Peninsula of the island of Hispaniola (present-day Dominican Republic) at the time of the Spanish Conquest. The Ciguayos appear to have predated the agricultural Taíno who inhabited much of the island. The language appears to have been moribund at the time of Spanish contact, and was extinct within a century.

Ciguayo was spoken on the northeastern coast of the Roman Catholic Diocese of Magua from Nagua southward to at least the Yuna River, and throughout the Samana Peninsula.

== Lexicon ==
Little is known of Ciguayo apart from it being a distinct language from Taíno and neighboring Macorix.

The only attested word securely identifiable as Ciguayo is "gold", tuob (presumably [tuˈob] or [ˈtwob]; the latter reconstruction with an initial consonant cluster is deemed "arbitrary" by Adelaar).

=== Quizquella controversy ===
Julian Granberry and Gary Vescelius (2004) attribute Quizquella (presumably [kisˈkeja]), explained in a note by Mártir de Anghiera as referring to 'greatness', to Ciguayo. Adelaar is skeptical of this attribution due to a lack of historical evidence.

Granberry & Vescelius further controversially speculate that Ciguayo was closely related to the Tolan languages of Honduras on phonotactic grounds. They rule out Arawakan origin due to the presence of what they identify as consonant clusters in Quizquella and tuob. Such clusters are prohibited in Arawakan but would be permitted in Tolan.

== See also ==
- Indigenous languages of the Caribbean
