= Guanahatabey language =

Extinct unclassified language of Cuba

Guanahatabey
- Guanajatabey
- (unattested)
- Native to: Cuba
- Region: Pinar del Río Province and Isla de la Juventud
- Ethnicity: Guanahatabey
- Extinct: 16th century
- Language family: unclassified

Language codes
- ISO 639-3: None (mis)
- Glottolog: None
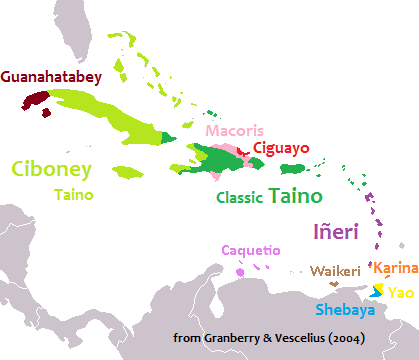
- Precolombian languages of the Antilles, according to Granberry and Vescelius. Guanahatabey Ciboney Taíno, Classic Taíno, and Iñeri were Arawakan, Kariʼna and Yao were Cariban. Macorix, Ciguayo and Guanahatabey are unclassified.

Guanahatabey (Guanajatabey) was the unattested language of the Guanahatabey people, a hunter-gatherer society that lived in western Cuba until the 16th century. Very little is known of it, as the Guanahatabey disappeared early in the period of Spanish colonization before substantial information about them was recorded. Evidence suggests it was distinct from the Ciboney and Taíno languages spoken in the rest of the island.

== Background ==
The Guanahatabey were hunter-gatherers that appear to have predated the agricultural Ciboney, the Taíno group that inhabited most of Cuba. By the contact period, the Guanahatabey lived primarily in far western Pinar del Río Province, which the Ciboney did not settle and was colonized by the Spanish relatively late. Spanish accounts indicate that Guanahatabey was distinct from and mutually unintelligible with the Taíno language spoken in the rest of Cuba and throughout the Caribbean. Not a single word of the Guanahatabey language has been documented.

== Toponyms ==
However, Julian Granberry and Gary Vescelius have identified five placenames that they consider non-Taíno, and which may thus derive from Guanahatabey. Granberry and Vescelius argue that the names have parallels in the Warao language, and further suggest a possible connection with the Macoris language of Hispaniola (see Waroid languages).

Possible Guanahatabey toponyms
Name	Warao parallel	Warao meaning
Camujiro	ka-muhi-ru	'palm-tree trunks'
Guara	wara	'white heron'
Guaniguaníco (mountain range in western Cuba)	wani-wani-ku	'hidden moon, moon-set'
Hanábona (a savannah)	hana-bana	'sugarcane plumes'
Júcaro (three locations)	hu-karo	'double pointed, tree crotch'

== See also ==
- Indigenous languages of the Caribbean
