= Volvarina taina =

Scientific classification
- Kingdom: Animalia
- Phylum: Mollusca
- Class: Gastropoda
- Subclass: Caenogastropoda
- Order: Neogastropoda
- Family: Marginellidae
- Genus: Volvarina
- Species: V. taina

Binomial name
- Volvarina taina Espinosa & Ortea, 2013

Species of gastropod

Volvarina taina is a species of sea snail, a marine gastropod mollusk in the family Marginellidae, the margin snails.

== Etymology ==
The name taina is in reference to the Taíno people, an Indigenous culture of the Caribbean region.

== Discovery ==
V. taina was first identified in a 2013 article by Espinosa and Ortea. Several other previously unknown species from the Marginellidae family were discovered and recorded during the same undertaking. The original specimen was found near Guantanamo, Cuba.

== Description ==
The length of the shell is 8.3 mm, and its diameter is 3.3 mm.

The sea snail's shell was described as smooth and shiny, and of a medium size for its family, although its coil is relatively wide. It has an extended and broad spire of its shell, and two strong folds that merge into a columella at the anterior end of the shell.

== Distribution ==
This marine species occurs off Cuba in the Caribbean Sea.
