= Higüey (disambiguation) =

Higüey is a city in the Dominican Republic.

Higüey may also refer to:

- Higüey (chiefdom), of the Taíno people; see Chiefdoms of Hispaniola#Chiefdom of Higüey
- Higüey, a sector of the city of Aguadilla, Puerto Rico
