= Quisqueya =

Quisqueya or Kiskeya or Kiskella, is a term of Ciguayo origin originally used to refer to the Island of Hispaniola. In modern times it is sometimes used specifically as a name for the Dominican Republic, which covers part of the island.

Quisqueya (or Kiskeya or Kiskella) may also refer to:

- Quisqueya (plant), a genus of Laeliinae
- Quisqueya, Dominican Republic, a municipality of the San Pedro de Macorís province
- Quisqueya, Distrito Nacional, a neighbourhood in the city of Santo Domingo, Dominican Republic
- Quisqueya Henríquez (1966-2024), Cuban-born Dominican Republic visual artist
- Estadio Quisqueya, a baseball stadium in Santo Domingo
- Tele Quisqueya, a television station located in Saint-Marc, Haiti
- Quisqueya University, a university in Port-au-Prince, Haiti

== See also ==
- Aerovías Quisqueyana, or simply Quisqueyana, an airline from the Dominican Republic
- Quisqueyano, a person of Dominican descent; see Dominican Republic § Etymology
