= Ciguayos =

Ethnic group native to the Dominican Republic

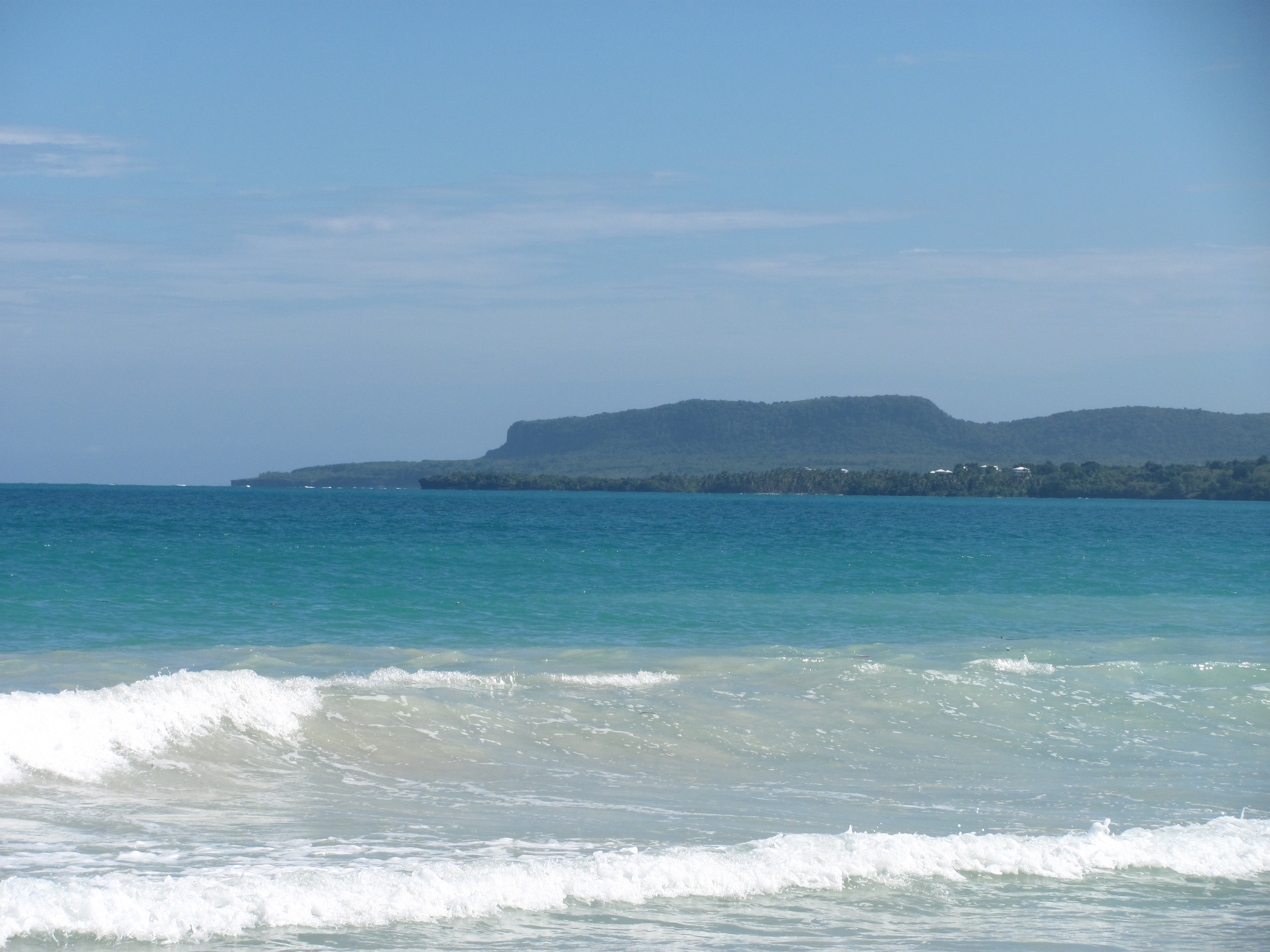
Cabo Samaná: where Columbus encountered the Ciguayos

The Ciguayos (Spanish pronunciation: [siˈɣwaʝos]) were a group of Indigenous people who inhabited the Samaná Peninsula and its adjoining regions in the present-day Dominican Republic. The Ciguayos appear to have predated the agricultural Taíno who inhabited much of the island. The Ciguayo language was spoken on the northeastern coast of the Maguá chiefdom from Nagua southward to at least the Yuna River, and throughout all of the Samaná Province.

Since the moment of contact early Spanish writers perceived them as a threat and portrayed them flaunting long hair and brandishing bows with poisoned arrows. Their archery tradition is linked to the Kalinago. Their legacy has spawned folktales, and since the 19th century, their memory has been at the center of the Dominican Indigenist movement.

== Society and characteristics ==
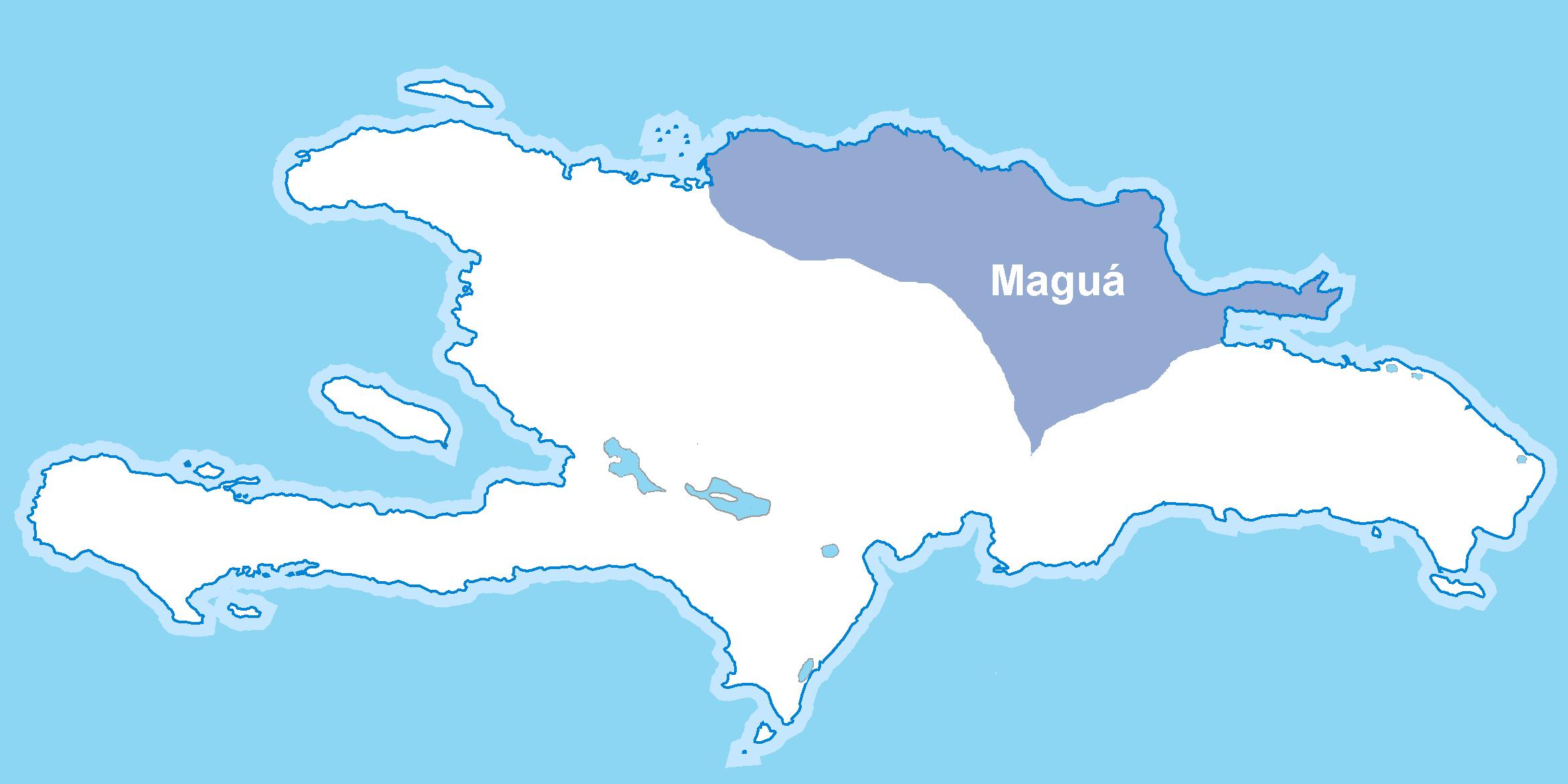
Nagua region.

The Ciguayos are considered a separate people who inhabited the Peninsula of Samaná and part of the northern coast toward Nagua in what today is the Dominican Republic, and, by most contemporary and historical accounts, differed in language and customs from the classical Taíno who lived on the eastern part of the island of Hispaniola then known. The Ciguayos were physically distinguished from the Taínos because they were taller, they painted their bodies with black dye and allowed their hair to grow longer, which they adorned with feathers, to the entire length, according to Bartolomé de las Casas. Also in the expression of the countenance the Ciguayos were more severe than the Taínos. Their bows were larger and their arrows had poison at the tip. They spoke another language that was not the common one of most of the island. At the end of the 15th century the Ciguayos occupied the Macorís de Arriba, mountain ranges of the today Cordillera Septentrional that were then called Ciguay, their ruler was Mayobanex. Wilson (1990) states that circa 1500 this was the cacicazgo (chiefdom) of the cacique Guacangarí.

According to Eustaquio Fernandez de Navarrete, they were “warriors and spirited people,” (“gente animosa y guerrera”). The Cronista de Indias, Pedro Martir accused them of cannibalism: “when they descend from the mountains to wage war on their neighbors, they kill and eat some of them” (“trae[n] origen de los caníbales, pues cuando de las montañas bajan a lo llano para hacer guerra á sus vecinos, si matan á algunos se los comen”).

== Language ==
Fray Ramón Pané, often dubbed as the first anthropologist of the Caribbean, distinguished the Ciguayo language from the rest of those spoken on Hispaniola. Bartolomé de las Casas, who studied the Ciguayos and was one of the few who read Ramón Pané’s original work in Spanish, provided most of the documentation about this group.

A single word of Ciguayo was recorded by las Casas: tuob, meaning "gold". On the basis of this word Julian Granberry & Gary Vescelius (2004) hypothesize that the Ciguayo language was related to the Tol language of Honduras and that the Ciguayos originated in Mesoamerica. They also suggest that the Indigenous name of Hispaniola, Kiskeya, was Ciguayo in origin and may have meant "a very mountainous, heavily forested terrain".
