= L. Antonio Curet =

Puerto Rican archaeologist

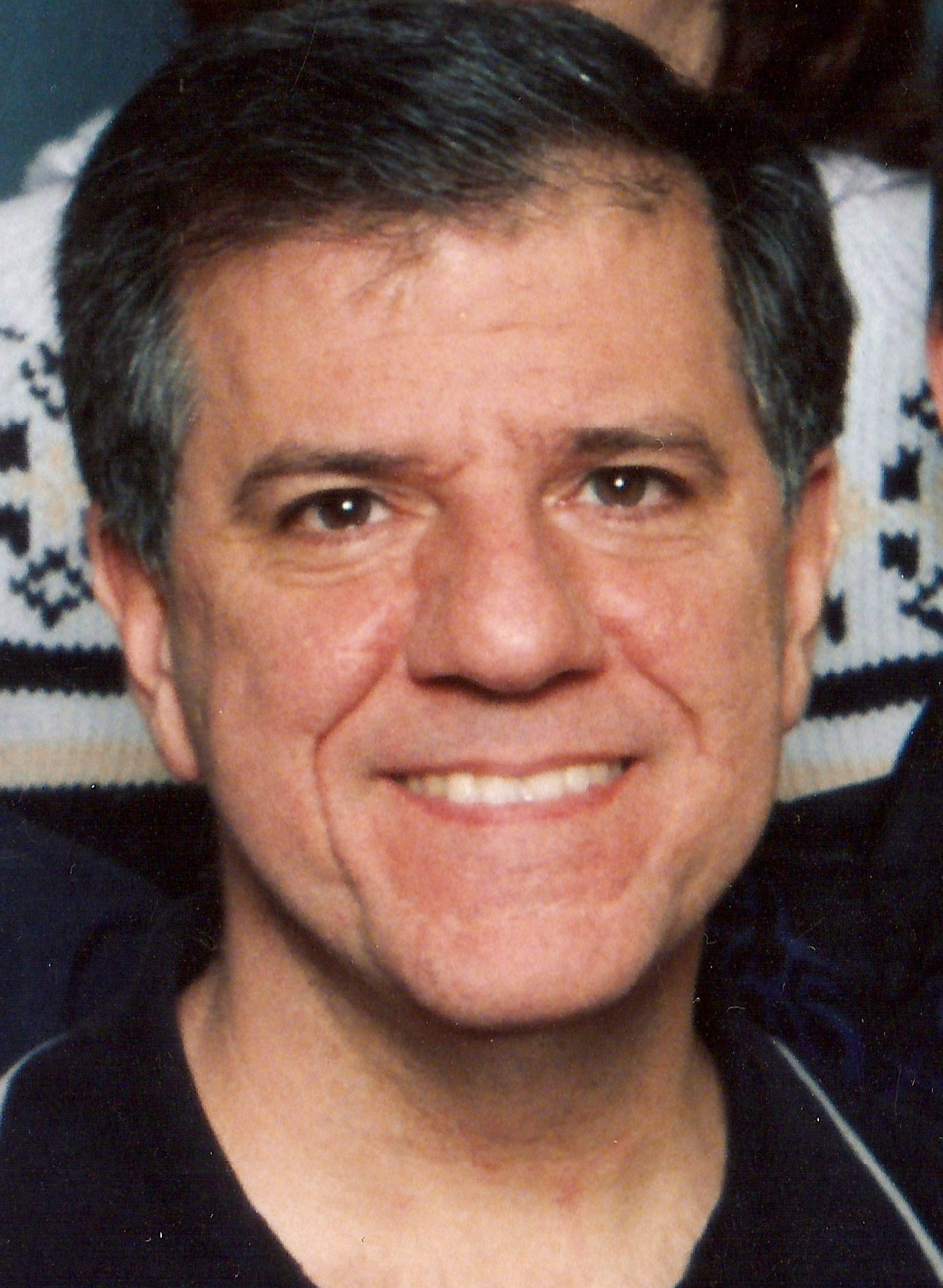

L Antonio Curet is an archaeologist who is a curator at the Smithsonian’s National Museum of the American Indian.

He was born in San Juan, Puerto Rico. He received his B.A. and M.A. in Chemistry from the University of Puerto Rico, Rio Piedras. Curet then received his Ph.D. in Archaeology from Arizona State University in 1992 under Barbara L Stark.

He started his career in academia as an assistant professor at Gettysburg College from 1993 to 1996. He then moved to the University of Colorado at Denver where he continued teaching as an assistant professor. He stayed from 1996 to 2000. He worked at the Field Museum as a curator from 2000 to 2013. During his time here he also taught as an adjunct professor at the University of Illinois at Chicago, Northwestern University, the University of Chicago, and DePaul University. In 2005 he published a book titled Caribbean Paleodemography. In 2009 he edited a book called Tibes: People, Power, and Ritual at the Center of the Cosmos.

In 2013 he began working as a curator at the National Museum of the American Indian on the collections from Latin America and the Caribbean.
