= Shebayo language =

Extinct Arawakan language of Trinidad

Shebayo
- Saluaio
- Native to: Trinidad and Tobago
- Region: Trinidad
- Era: attested 1633
- Language family: Arawakan: Northern; Ta-Arawakan; Shebayo

Language codes
- ISO 639-3: None (mis)
- Glottolog: sheb1234
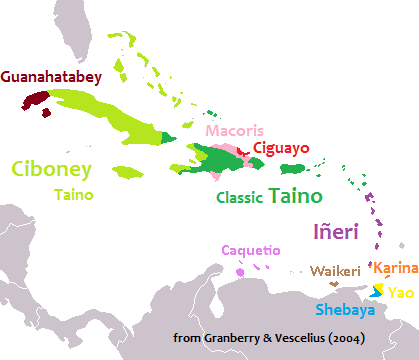
- Shebayo

Shebayo (Saluaio) is an extinct Arawakan language of Trinidad. It is only attested by a few words in a 1633 book by Joannes de Laet. Aikhenvald (1999) classifies it with the Ta-Arawakan (Caribbean Arawakan) languages.

== Vocabulary ==
The following is a compilation of all Shebayo vocabularies collected by Laet (1633), de Goeje (1939) and Taylor (1977).

Shebayo vocabulary
de Laet (1633)	de Goeje (1939)	Taylor (1977)	gloss
heja	heja	heia, heja	father
hamma	hamma	hamma	mother
wackewijrrij	wa-ckewijrrij	wackewijrrij	head
vvackenoely	wa-ckenoey	wackenoely, wackenoey	ear
noeyerii	noeyerri	noeyerri	eye
vvassibaly	wa-ssibaly	wassibaly, wassi	nose
darrymaily	darrymaily	darrymaily	mouth
vvadacoely	wa-dacoely	wadacoely	teeth
vvatabaye	wa-tabaye	watabaye	legs
vvackehyrry	wa-ckehyrry	wackehyrry	feet
ataly	ataly	ataly	tree
hoerapallii	hoerapalli	hoerapallii	bow
hewerry	hewerry	hewerry	arrow
kyrtryrre	kyrtzyrre	kyrtzyrre	moon
vvecoelije	wecoelije	wecoelije	sun
annoto	annoto	-	urucu
