= Nagua =

- Municipality
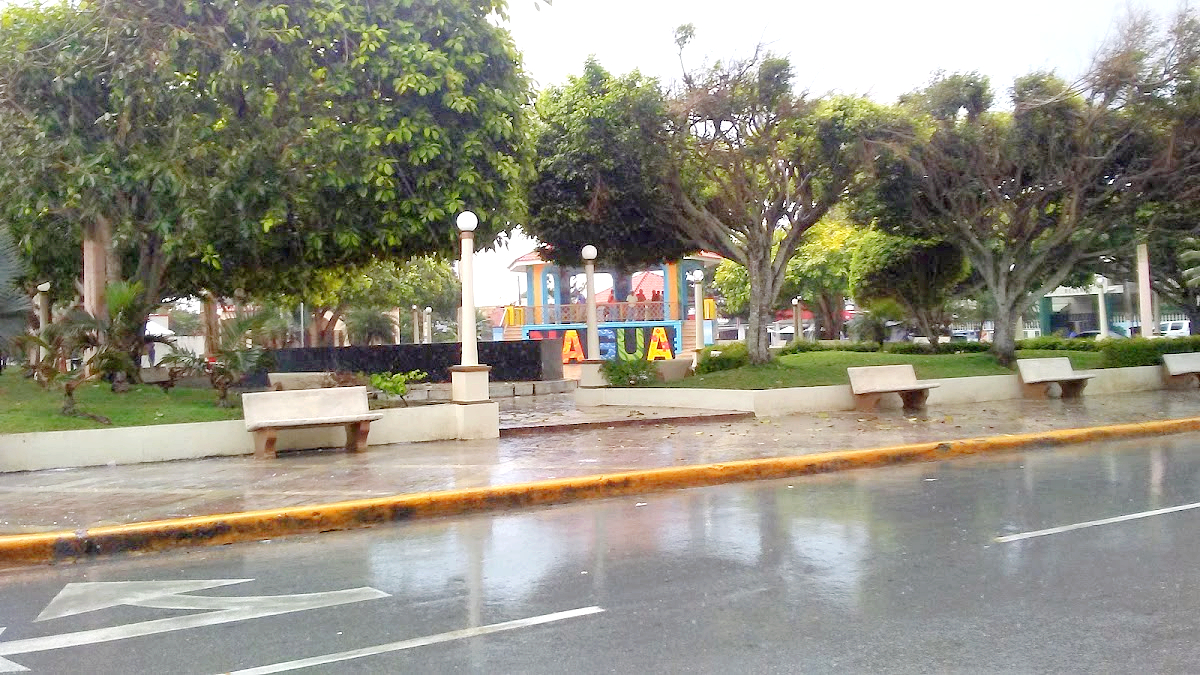
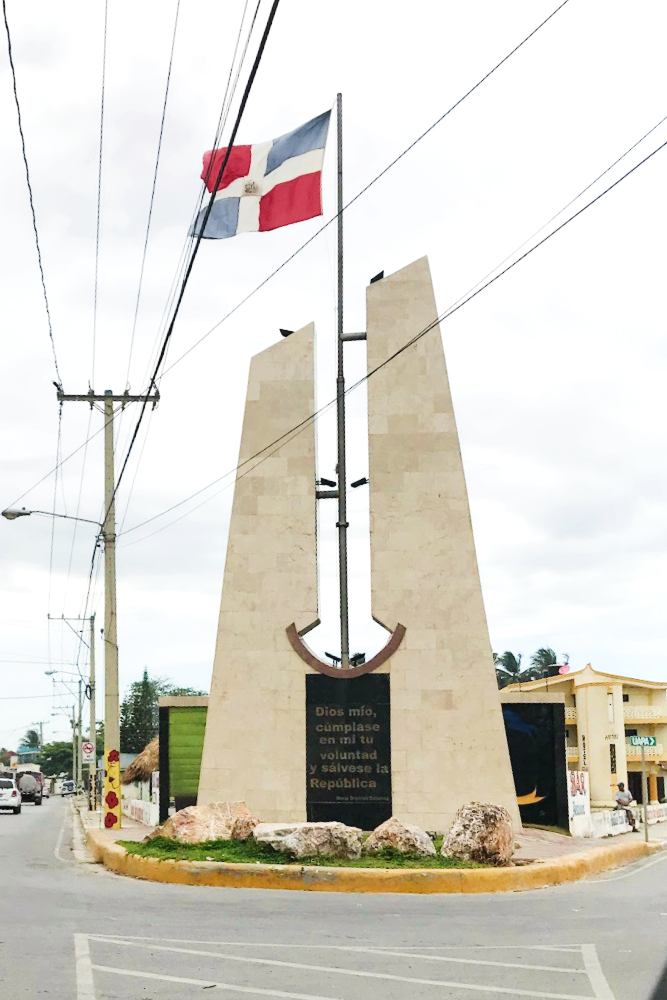
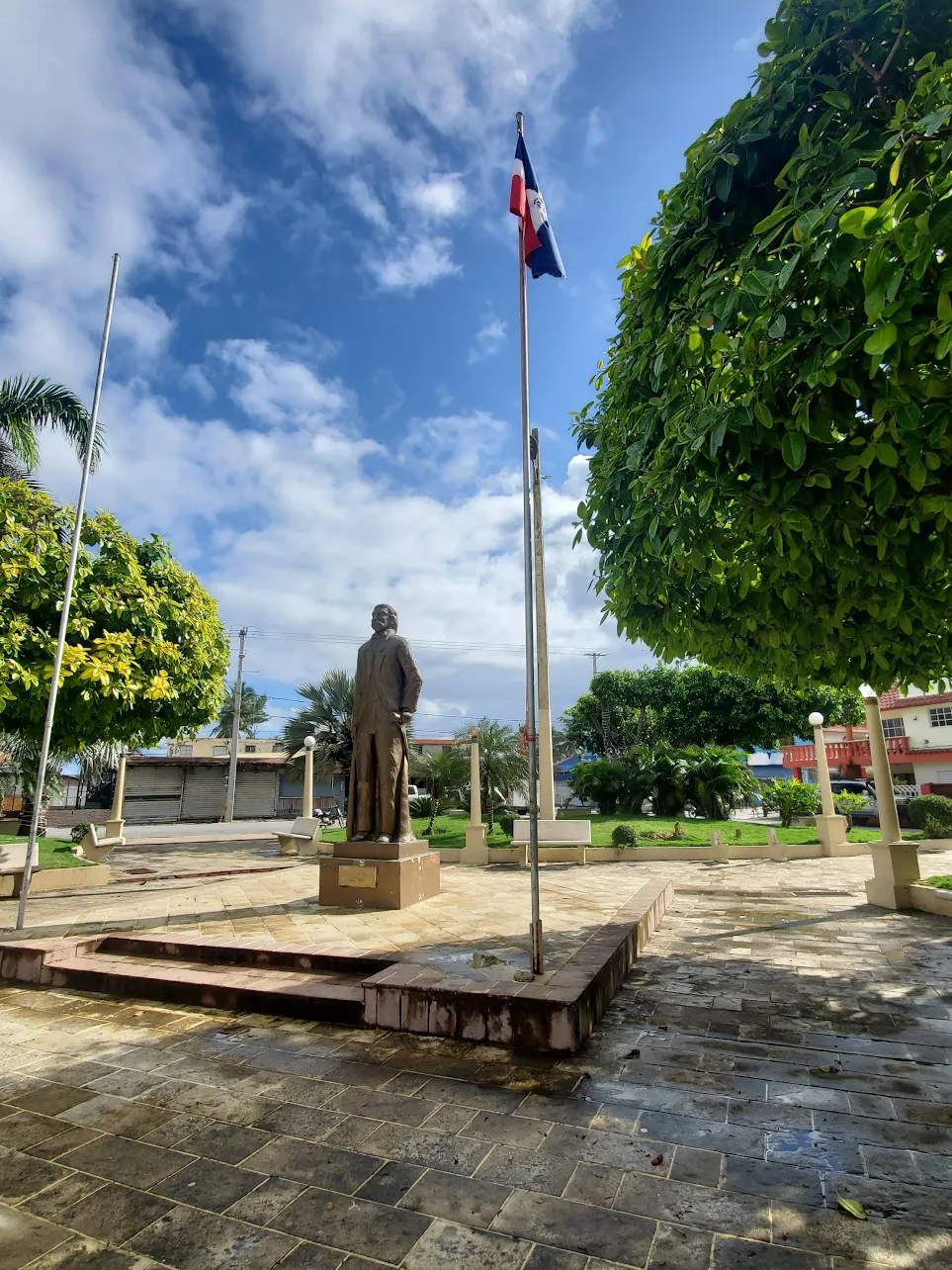
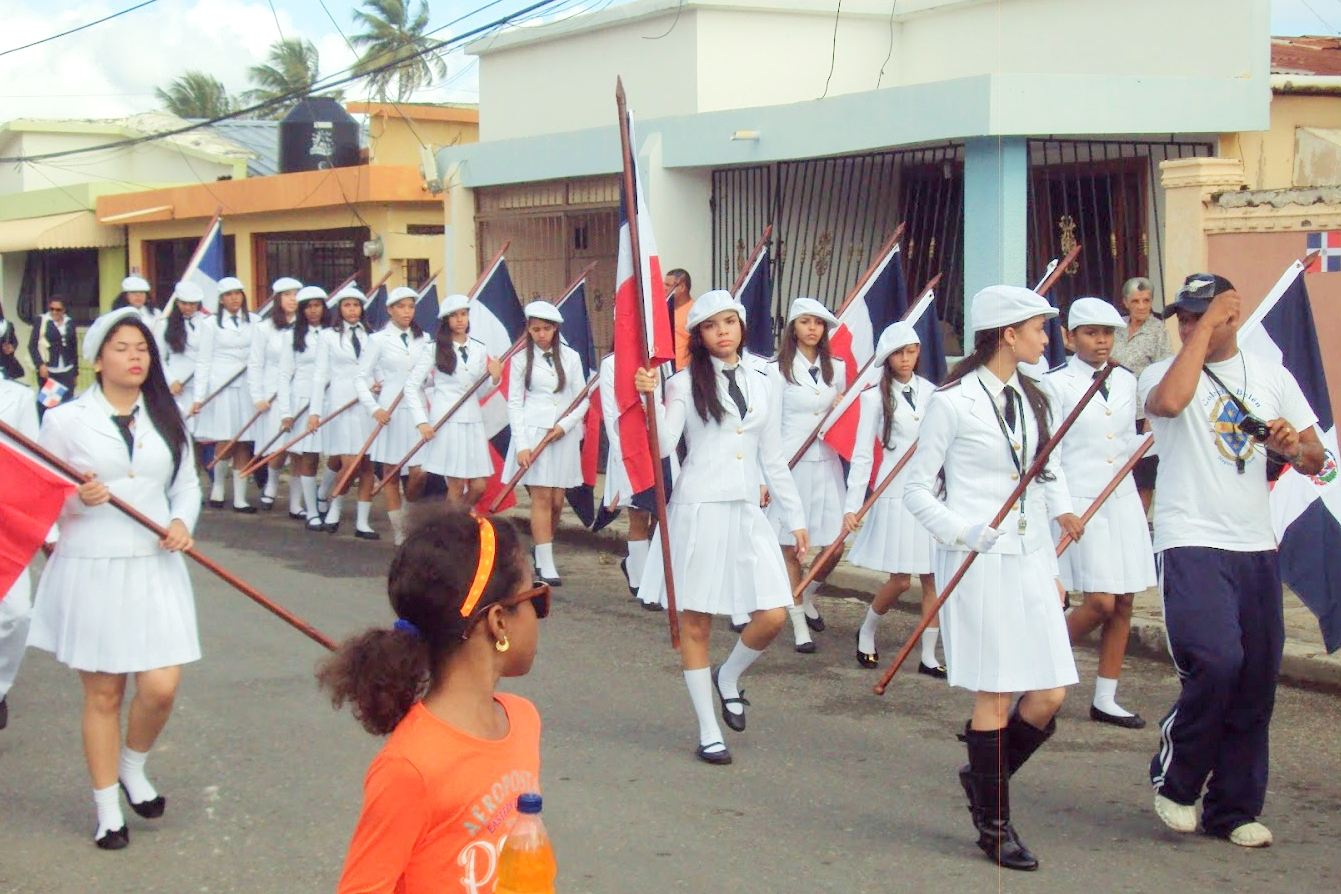
- Clockwise from top: Main square, statue of Juan Pablo Duarte, Students of Nagua, Maria Trinidad Sanchez monument.

- Location within the Dominican Republic
- Coordinates: 19°22′48″N 69°51′0″W
- Country: Dominican Republic
- Province: María Trinidad Sánchez
- Municipality since: 1938

Area
  - Total: 552.71 km^{2} (213.40 sq mi)
- Elevation: 3 m (9.8 ft)

Population (2012)
  - Total: 79,420
  - Density: 143.7/km^{2} (372.2/sq mi)
- Distance to – Santo Domingo: 170 km
- Municipal Districts: 3
- Climate: Af

Nagua is the capital of María Trinidad Sánchez province, in the northeastern Dominican Republic.

A medium-sized city, Nagua's economy relies on the production of agricultural products, principally rice, coconuts, and cocoa bean. Located on the north of the Samaná Peninsula, Nagua lies on the highway leading from Puerto Plata to the city of Samaná.

== History ==
What is today the town of Nagua, began in the 19th century, as fishing village made up of two rows of houses that its inhabitants built next to the waters of the bay. From their homes built, mostly of wood, the nagüeros had Matanzas as the commercial, administrative, and political center of the entire area between Sosúa, Puerto Plata, in the north, and Samaná, located at the tip of the Northeast Region. San José de Matanza, which is now a municipal district, was a town founded before the Republic was born. It had a small but active pier, from which trade with other parts of the country was activated.

As a consequence of the damage suffered by an earthquake; the inhabitants of Matanzas were forced to move permanently to the municipality of Julia Molina in its entirety. When immigrating in said municipality, more than 100 families; they contributed to its progress and aggrandizement, especially in the social aspect since they brought with them their customs and traditions.

== Location ==
Most of the town lies below sea level, which some believe makes Nagua susceptible to flooding that could destroy a substantial part of the town. In fact, during the reign of Rafael Trujillo (1930–1961), the neighboring town of Matanza, also below sea level, was destroyed by flooding caused by a magnitude 8.0 earthquake, in 1946. Many residents of Matanza chose to resettle in the area that is now Nagua. Matanza is now a small town called Matancita, just south of the city limits of Nagua.

== Climate ==
Climate data for Nagua (1961-1990)
Month	Jan	Feb	Mar	Apr	May	Jun	Jul	Aug	Sep	Oct	Nov	Dec	Year
Record high °C (°F)	35.0 (95.0)	34.4 (93.9)	35.2 (95.4)	35.2 (95.4)	36.8 (98.2)	37.0 (98.6)	36.4 (97.5)	35.5 (95.9)	37.6 (99.7)	35.6 (96.1)	35.3 (95.5)	33.6 (92.5)	37.6 (99.7)
Mean daily maximum °C (°F)	28.5 (83.3)	28.9 (84.0)	29.5 (85.1)	29.9 (85.8)	30.2 (86.4)	30.8 (87.4)	30.8 (87.4)	31.0 (87.8)	31.3 (88.3)	30.8 (87.4)	29.8 (85.6)	28.8 (83.8)	30.0 (86.0)
Mean daily minimum °C (°F)	20.1 (68.2)	20.2 (68.4)	20.6 (69.1)	21.0 (69.8)	21.5 (70.7)	22.2 (72.0)	22.2 (72.0)	22.5 (72.5)	22.6 (72.7)	22.3 (72.1)	21.7 (71.1)	20.5 (68.9)	21.5 (70.7)
Record low °C (°F)	12.6 (54.7)	14.0 (57.2)	15.9 (60.6)	15.9 (60.6)	16.7 (62.1)	16.0 (60.8)	17.0 (62.6)	17.0 (62.6)	17.1 (62.8)	17.1 (62.8)	15.7 (60.3)	11.8 (53.2)	11.8 (53.2)
Average rainfall mm (inches)	137.9 (5.43)	97.2 (3.83)	99.2 (3.91)	146.0 (5.75)	230.3 (9.07)	111.7 (4.40)	118.0 (4.65)	155.3 (6.11)	146.1 (5.75)	216.1 (8.51)	253.6 (9.98)	214.9 (8.46)	1,926.3 (75.84)
Average rainy days (≥ 1.0 mm)	11.5	8.9	7.6	9.0	12.5	9.3	11.4	12.8	11.7	13.3	15.3	14.6	137.9
Source: NOAA

== Economy ==
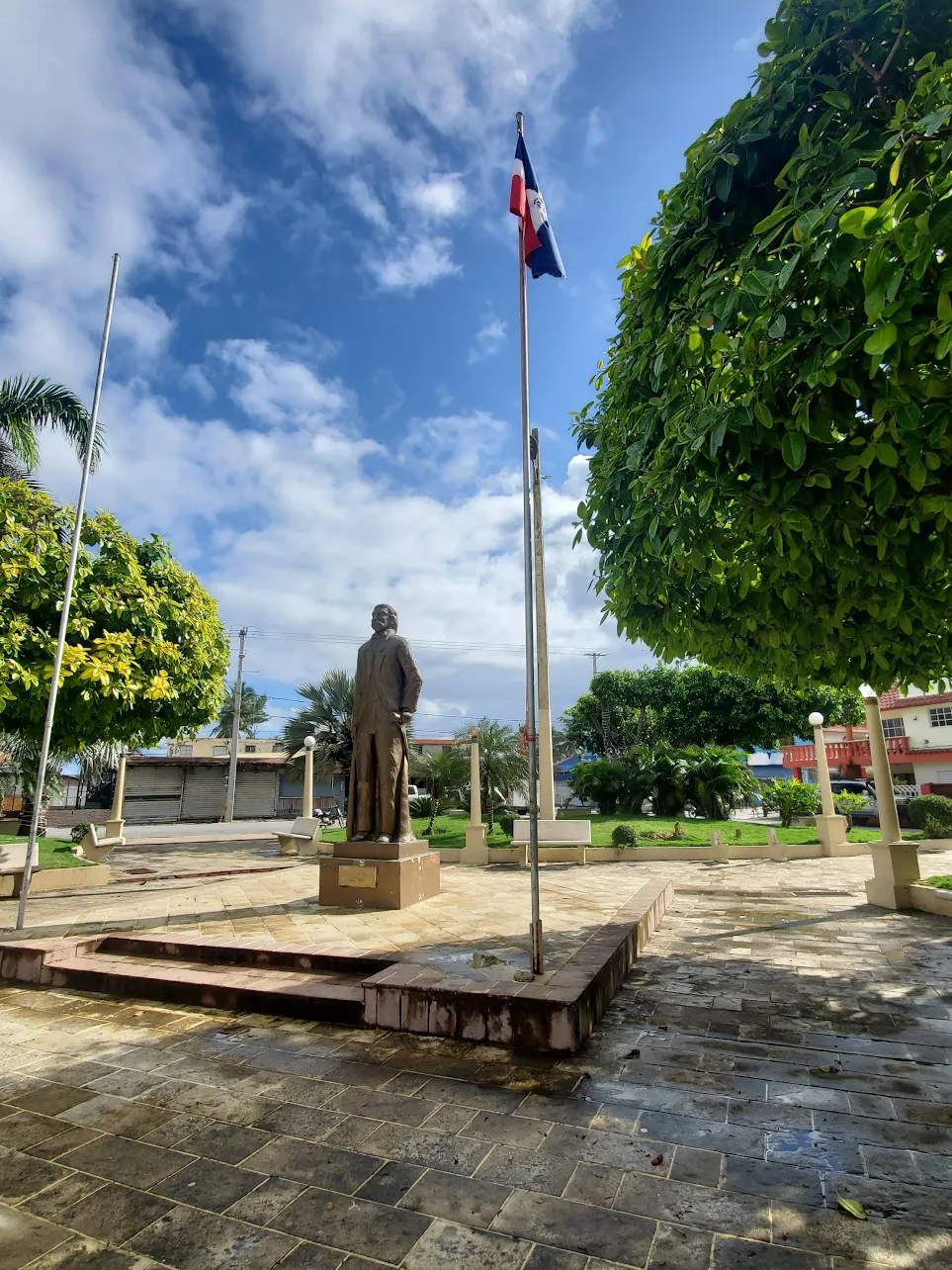
Nagua beach town center square.

The economy of the municipality of Nagua is based mainly on the agricultural sector. Agriculture in the municipality is based mainly on the following products: rice, coconut, cocoa, peanuts, oranges and root vegetables. The livestock sector has some 69 farms dedicated to dairy production, with a total of 9,379 head of cattle. Which produce about 15,534 liters of milk per day.

The constant migrations of locals that occur contribute to improving the economy, due to remittances. This is one of the reasons why there have been constructions and investments contributing to economic growth in recent years. Another cause that contributes to the economic development of the municipality is the installation of branches of the various banks that operate in the country. As well as other contributions made by businessmen, especially in its industries, block factories, pharmacies, various businesses, among others.

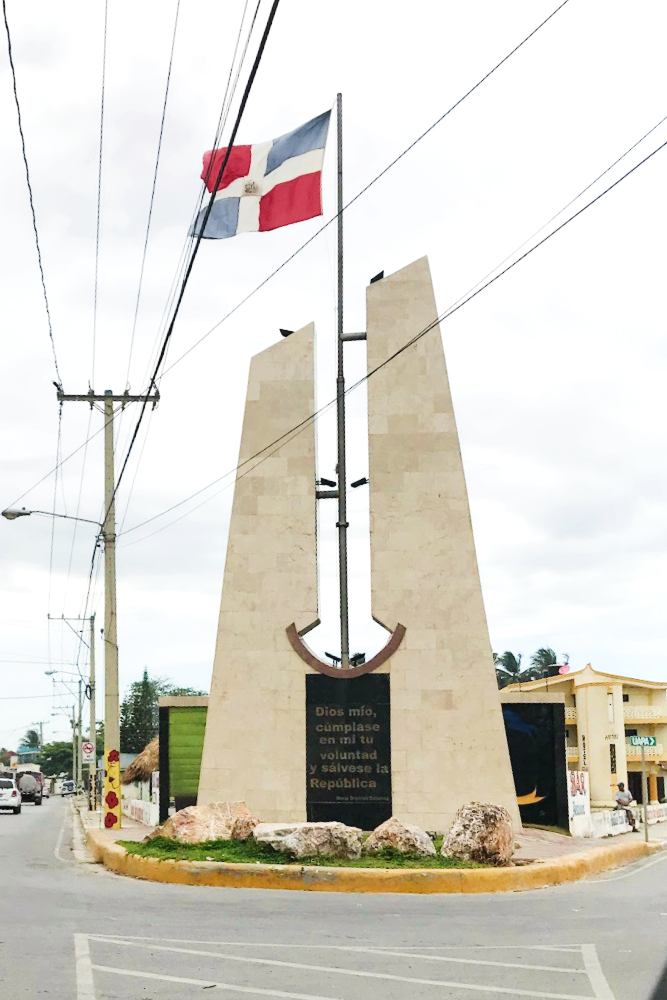
Monument in nagua.

In addition, since the municipality is bordered by an extensive beach area, this facilitates the construction of hotels and restaurants, in order to make internal tourism more effective, efficient and frequent.

== Notable people ==
- Baltimore Orioles pitcher Ubaldo Jiménez was born in Nagua.
- Oakland Athletics pitcher Jordan Norberto was born in Nagua.
- St. Louis Cardinals utilityman Yairo Muñoz was born in Nagua.
- Tatico Henriquez which some consider to be the godfather of merengue tipico.
