= Ciboney =

Taíno people of eastern Cuba and the Tiburon Peninsula of Haiti

The Ciboney inhabited central Cuba and possibly Jamaica (here labeled taínos occidentales, circled in orange, which also includes the Lucaya of the Bahamas)

The Ciboney (/ˌsiːbəˈneɪ/ or /ˌsiːboʊˈneɪ/), or Siboney, were an Indigenous people of Cuba, the Tiburon Peninsula of Haiti, and possibly Jamaica. According to some scholars, including Julian Granberry and Gary Vescelius, the Ciboney were a Western Taíno group living in Cuba during the 15th and 16th centuries, who had a dialect and culture distinct from the Classic Taíno who began migrating from Hispaniola after 1450, though much of the Ciboney territory was under the control of the eastern chiefs. Other scholars, including L. Antonio Curet and Cayetano Coll y Toste, do not classify the Ciboney as Taino. Confusion in the historical sources led 20th-century scholars to apply the name "Ciboney" to the non-Taíno Guanahatabey of western Cuba and various archaic cultures around the Caribbean, but this is deprecated.

== History ==
At the time of Spanish colonization, the Ciboney were the most populous group in Cuba. They inhabited the central part of the island, between western Pinar del Río Province and eastern Oriente Province. Bartolomé de las Casas, who lived among the Ciboney in the early 16th century, related that their dialect and culture was similar to that of the Lucayans of the present-day Bahamas. As such, some scholars such as Julian Granberry and Gary S. Vescelius classify the Ciboney as a Western Taíno group, associating them with the peoples of the Bahamas, westernmost Hispaniola, and possibly Jamaica, while distinguishing them from the Hispaniolan Classic Taíno of eastern Cuba, most of Hispaniola, and Puerto Rico. Granberry and Vescelius write that in addition to the Hispaniolan Classic Taíno in eastern Cuba, the Ciboney shared the island with the Guanahatabey, an archaic people inhabiting western Pinar del Río Province. They write that the Ciboney spoke a dialect of the Taíno language conventionally known as Ciboney Taíno, which was distinct from, but mutually intelligible with, Classic Taíno.

The Ciboney were the dominant population in Cuba until around 1450. Las Casas states that unlike the highly organized Indigenous peoples of Hispaniola to the east, the Ciboney had no integrated chiefdoms or wider political structure. In the mid-15th century, according to Granberry and Vescelius, the Classic Taíno from Hispaniola began migrating into eastern Cuba, overcoming the Indigenous Ciboney. These "Cuban Taíno" from Hispaniola established chiefdoms concentrated in Oriente Province, though they established settlements as far west as Havana Province. However, the Cuban Taíno never established an island-wide political structure as existed in Hispaniola and Puerto Rico. Classic Taíno migration from Hispaniola to Cuba increased after Spanish contact, with many Taíno leaving to escape the Spanish incursion. Notably, Hispaniola Taíno chief Hatuey fled to Cuba with most of his people; he remained there until the Spanish captured and executed him. Following the Spanish conquest of Cuba in 1511 under Diego Velázquez de Cuéllar, the population of all Native groups declined precipitously until they had disappeared as distinct groups by the end of the century.

== Classification ==
The archaeologist L. Antonio Curet has questioned whether the Ciboney people should be referred to as Taínos, writing that "Despite its widespread use in academic and popular publications, the use of the term Taíno has not gone without criticism or opposition" and that academics since the 1800s have been "criticizing its use and questioning its scientific basis and value and suggested using instead names such as siboneyes, haytianos, jamaiquinos, and borinqueños that were more related to actual terms used by the natives to refer to the islands."

The Puerto Rican historian Cayetano Coll y Toste did not use the term "Taino" to refer to the Ciboney or any other Indigenous peoples in the Greater Antilles. In his Prehistory of Puerto Rico, Coll y Toste wrote that some scholars used the term, but that he found "no scientific basis for this" stating his view that "Indo-Antilleans were Arawaks, and having lost the memory of their origin, they should be called...siboneyes, haytianos, jamaiquinos and boriqueños, because over time they had acquired their own personality."

== Confusion with other peoples ==
=== Guanahatabey in Cuba ===
In the 20th century, misreadings of the historical record led scholars to confuse the Ciboney with both a neighbouring group, the Guanahatabey, and with archaic-level populations around the Caribbean. Las Casas referred to both the Ciboney and the Guanahatabey, but he was clear they were different: the Guanahatabey were a primitive society of hunter-gatherers in western Cuba, and they spoke a separate language distinct from Taíno. A confusion of the sources led archaeologists to use the term "Ciboney" for the aceramic (lacking pottery) archaeological sites found on various Caribbean islands. As many of these were found in the former Guanahatabey territory, the term became associated with the historical non-Taíno Guanahatabey. Scholars recognized the error in the 1980s and have restored the name "Ciboney" to the Western Taíno people of Cuba.

=== Archaic Peoples of Antigua and Barbuda ===
The Archaic Peoples of Antigua and Barbuda, stone age settlers, are sometimes referred to as "Ciboney". However, the Ciboney never lived in Antigua and Barbuda.

== See also ==
- Siboney, Cuba, a town in eastern Cuba.
- Taíno, Indigenous people of the Greater Antilles and northern Lesser Antilles
