= Samaná Peninsula =

Península de Samaná
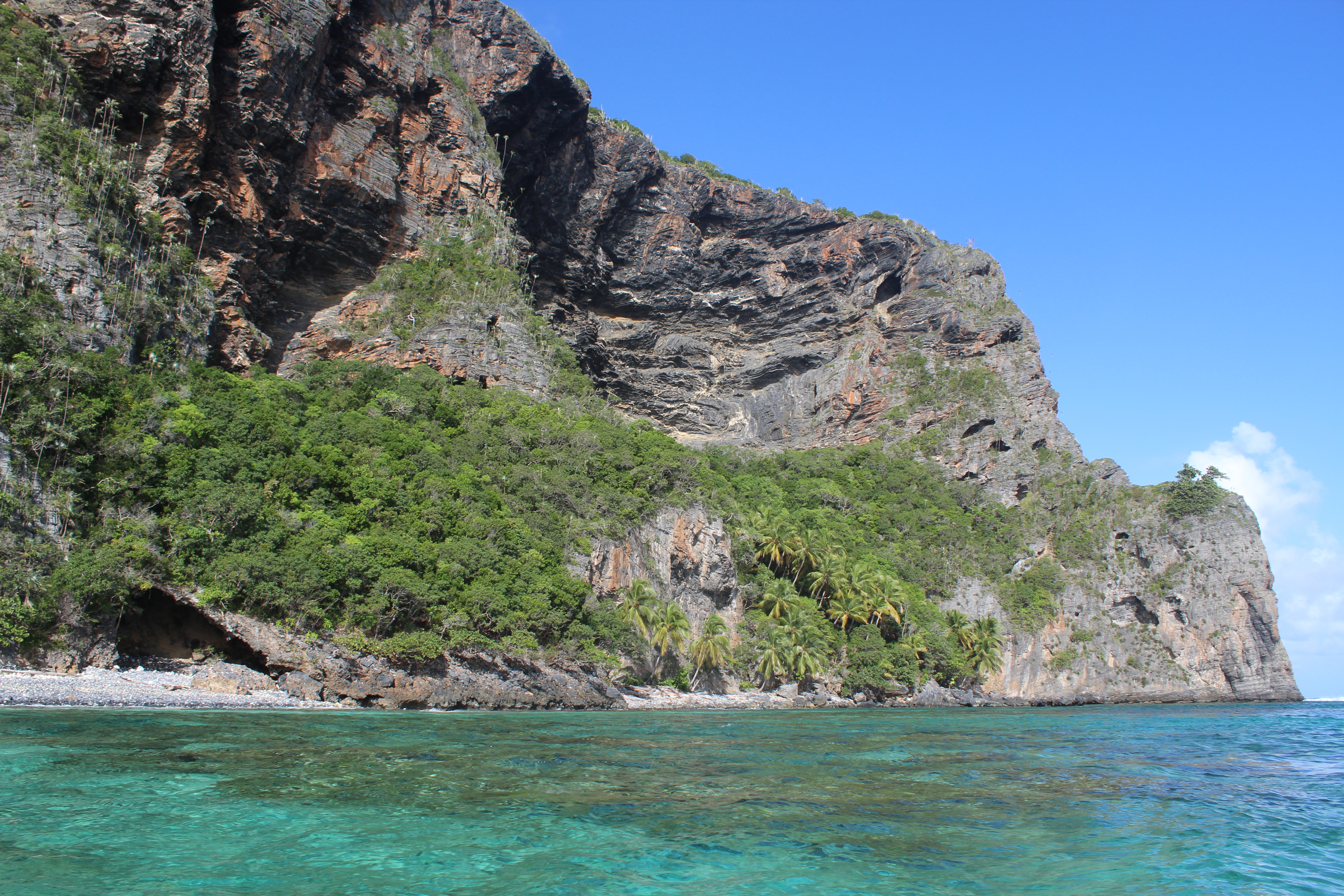

- Location within the Dominican Republic
- Coordinates: 19.250219°N 69.421234°Wn
- Country: Dominican Republic

Population (2008)
  - Total: 241,104

The Samaná Península is a peninsula in Dominican Republic situated in the province of Samaná. The Samaná Peninsula is connected to the rest of the state by the isthmus of Samaná; to its south is Samaná Bay. The peninsula contains many beaches, especially in the city of Santa Bárbara de Samaná. It contains three rivers. The peninsula was originally inhabited by the Ciguayos, who spoke the Ciguayo language at the time of Spanish intervention.

== Transportation ==
The main roads are the DR-5 and the Samaná Highway, which leads from the peninsula to Santo Domingo. The peninsula also contains the Samaná El Catey International Airport. The peninsula also hosts agriculture and tourism.

== Gallery ==
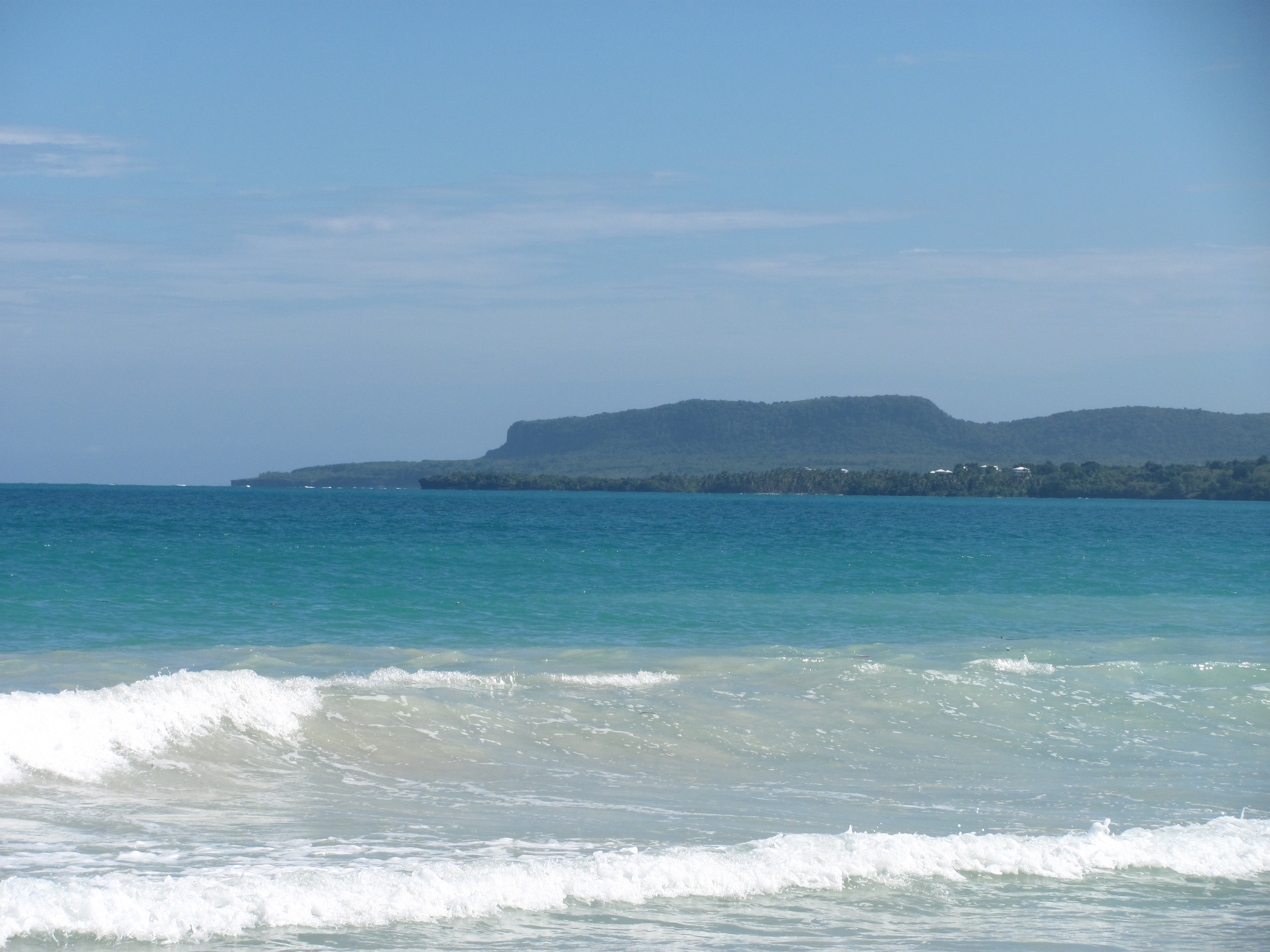
Cabo Samaná, at the eastern end of the peninsula

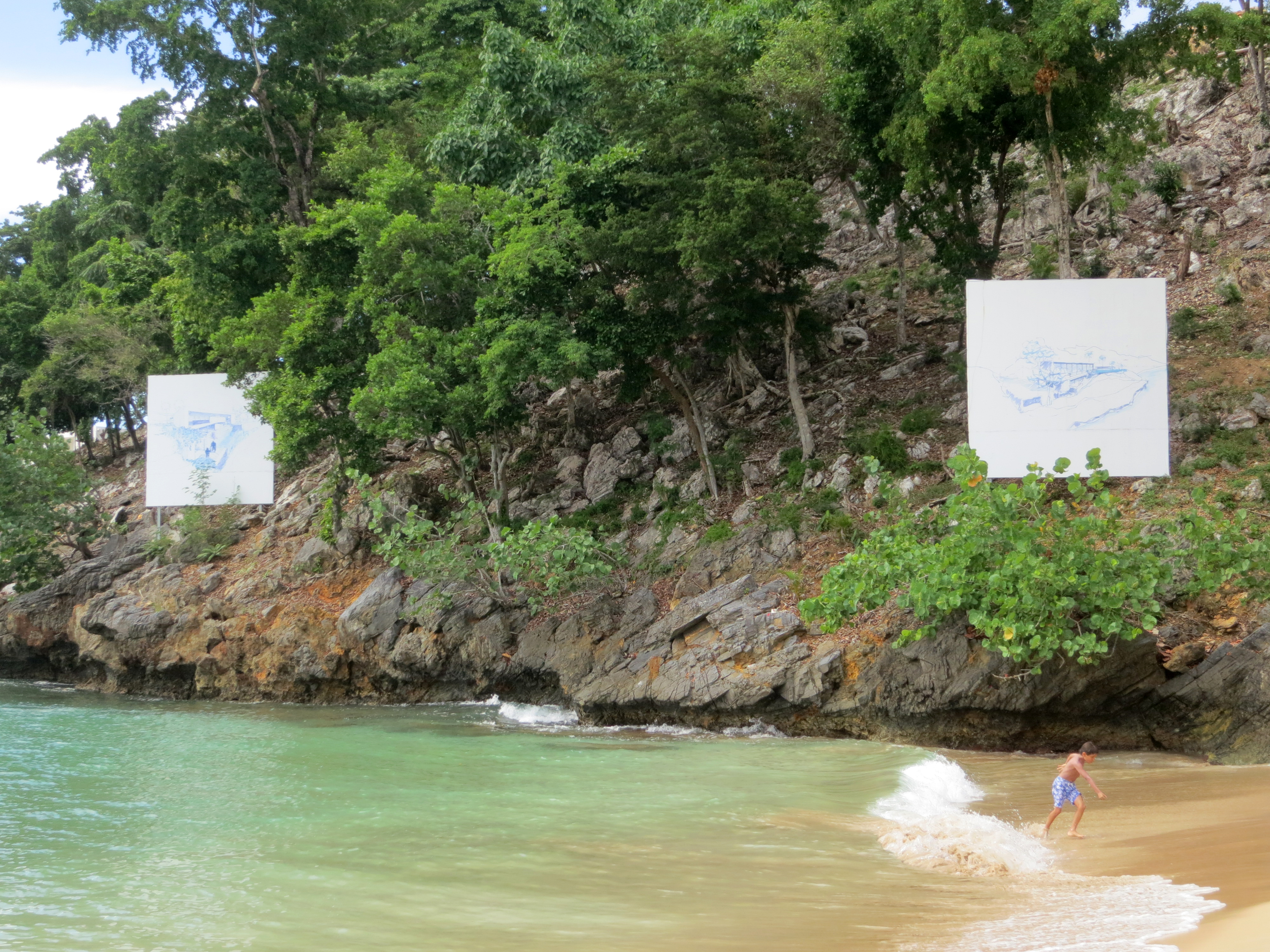
El Limon area of Samana, Dominican Republic

== See also ==
- 1873 Dominican Republic Samaná Peninsula referendum
- Raid on Samaná
