= Kalinago language =

Arawakan language historically spoken in the Lesser Antilles

Kalinago
- Igneri, Iñeri, Inyeri
- Kalhíphona
- Native to: Windward Islands (Guadeloupe to Grenada, except Barbados)
- Ethnicity: Kalinago, Igneri
- Extinct: c. 1918 in Dominica, with the death of Ma Gustave developed into Garifuna in St. Vincent
- Language family: Arawakan: Northern; Ta-Arawakan; Kalinago
- Writing system: Latin

Language codes
- ISO 639-3: crb
- Glottolog: isla1278
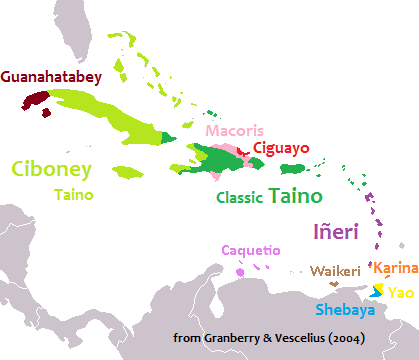
- Iñeri (Kalinago) among other pre-Columbian languages of the Antilles, according to Granberry and Vescelius

The Kalinago language, also known as Island Carib and Igneri (Iñeri, Inyeri, etc.), was an Arawakan language historically spoken by the Kalinago of the Lesser Antilles in the Caribbean. Kalinago proper became extinct by about 1920 due to population decline and colonial period deportations resulting in language death, but an offshoot survives as Garifuna in Central America.

Despite being known as Island Carib, the language was not closely related to the Carib language of the mainland Caribs. Instead, it appears to have been a development of the Arawakan language spoken by the islands' earlier Igneri inhabitants, which incoming Caribs adopted in the pre-Columbian era. During the French colonial period, Carib men also spoke a Cariban-derived pidgin amongst themselves.

== History ==
At the time of European contact, the Kalinago lived throughout the Windward Islands of the Lesser Antilles, from Guadeloupe to Grenada. Contemporary traditions indicated the Kalinago were related to the Kalina people (mainland Caribs) of South America and had conquered these islands from their previous inhabitants, the Igneri. As such the Kalinago were also known as Caribs or Island Caribs, and it was long assumed that they spoke Carib or a related Cariban language. However, studies in the 20th century determined that the language of the Antillean Caribs was not Cariban, but Arawakan, related to the Lokono language on the South American mainland and more distantly to the Taíno language of the Greater Antilles.

Modern scholars have proposed several hypotheses accounting for the prevalence of an Arawakan language among the Kalinago. Scholars such as Irving Rouse suggested that Caribs from South America conquered the Igneri but did not displace them, and took on their language over time. Others doubt there was an invasion at all. Sued Badillo proposed that Igneri living in the Lesser Antilles adopted the "Carib" identity due to their close economic and political ties with the rising mainland Carib polity in the 16th century. In any event, the fact that the Kalinago language evidently derived from a pre-existing Arawakan variety has led some linguists to term it "Igneri". It appears to have been as distinct from Taíno as from mainland Arawakan varieties.

During the period of French colonization in the 17th century, and possibly earlier, male Kalinago used a Cariban-based pidgin in addition to the Arawakan Kalinago language. The pidgin was evidently similar to one used by the Kalina to communicate with their Lokono neighbors. Berend J. Hoff and Douglas Taylor hypothesized that it dated to the time of the Carib expansion through the islands, and that males maintained it to emphasize their origins. However, scholars who doubt the existence of a Carib invasion suggest this pidgin was a later development acquired by contact with indigenous peoples of the mainland.

According to Douglas Taylor, when he visited Dominica in 1930, he was told by informants that the last speaker of the language had been Ma Gustave, a woman who had died roughly twelve years before. Douglas has stated that half a dozen older people told him that they had spoken or understood the language as children, but could only speak bits of the language with difficulty as adults.

== Phonology ==
=== Vowels ===
	Front	Central	Back
Close	i	ɨ	u
Mid	e	ɛ	o
Open	æ	a	ɑ

=== Consonants ===
Kalinago has 16 consonants.

	Labial	Alveolar		Palatal	Velar	Glottal
	Labial	plain	asp.	Palatal	Velar	Glottal
Stop	p	t			k	
Fricative	ɸ	(s)		ɕ	x	h
Nasal	m	n	nʰ	ɲ		
Approximant	w	l		j		
Flap		ɾ				

- /ɕ/ may also be heard as an alveolar [s] in free variation.
