= Anacaona =

Cacica from Hispaniola (c. 1474–c. 1504)

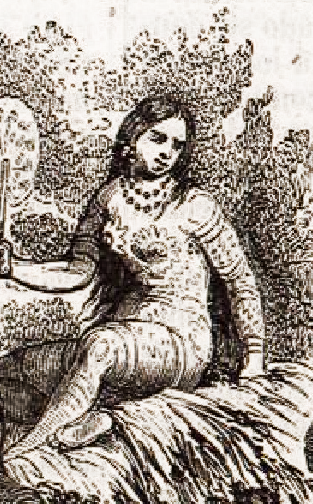
- Honors to Queen Anacaona, from A History of the Life and Voyages of Christopher Columbus by Washington Irving

Cacica of Jaragua
- Reign: 1500–1504
- Predecessor: Bohechío
- Born: c. 1474; Yaguana, Jaragua, Hispaniola
- Died: c. 1504 (aged c. 30); Santo Domingo
- Cause of death: Hanging
- Spouse: Caonabo

Anacaona (c. 1474 – c. 1504) was an Indigenous cacica (Taíno chief), zemi interpreter, composer, and poet born in Yaguana, Jaragua, Hispaniola (present-day Léogâne, Haiti). After the death of her brother Bohechío in 1500, she became the ruler of Jaragua. In the centuries since her death, she has been re-imagined and memorialized in various forms of poetry, music, and literature from Haiti, the Dominican Republic and the wider Caribbean.

Prior to becoming cacica, Anacaona was married to a Caonabo, a cacique from the Lucayos (now The Bahamas) who conquered the cacicazgo of Maguana in 1470. However, she spent most of her time in Jaragua with Bohechío. With Christopher Columbus's arrival in Hispaniola in 1492, the Spanish began enslaving Taínos, resulting in conflict. Caonabo, who fought against the Spanish, was ultimately captured and banished in 1496. After Christopher left, his brother Bartholomew took over the administration of Hispaniola in 1496. Anacaona played a prominent role during Bartholomew's visits to Jaragua, welcoming him, helping to facilitate tribute payments to him, and offering him valuable gifts, potentially suggesting her administrative authority and status as a steward of luxury goods.

As cacica, Anacaona initially maintained a policy of cooperation with the Spanish, who continued to mistreat and enslave the Taíno. This led to frequent rebellions, with many enslaved Taíno fleeing to find sanctuary in Jaragua. In 1497, Spanish rebels led by Francisco Roldán also sought refuge in Jaragua among the Taíno. In 1502, Nicolás de Ovando arrived in Hispaniola after being appointed governor, and, after subduing the cacicazgo of Higüey, traveled to Jaragua in 1503. Anacaona welcomed him, gathering the local Taíno to honor him. However, after the Spanish massacre of between 40 and 80 caciques, for which various reasons have been proposed, she was captured and transported to Santo Domingo (present-day Dominican Republic) and executed by the Spanish.

== Early life ==
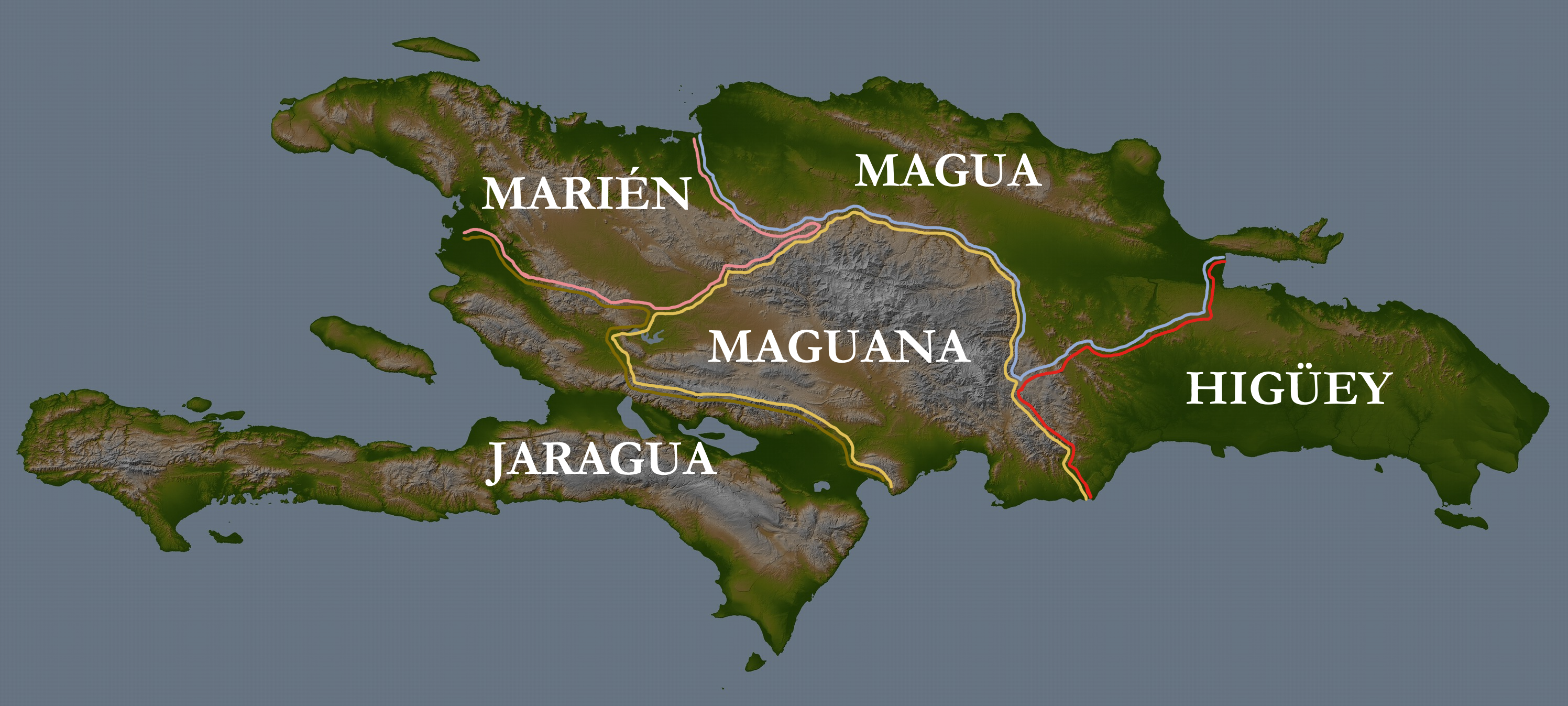
Distribution of cacicazgos upon Christopher Columbus's arrival in 1492

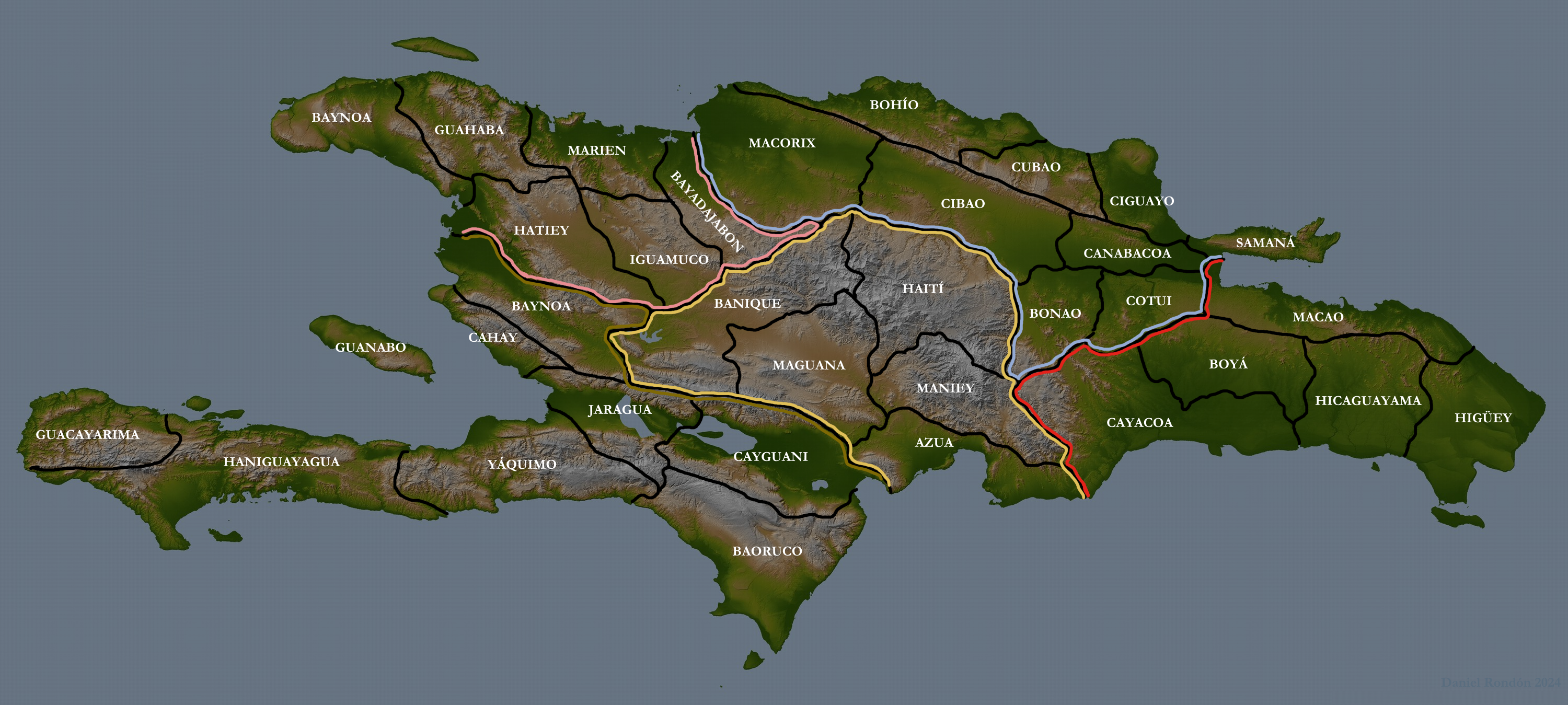
Cacicazgo subdivisions

Anacaona was born c. 1474 in Yaguana, Jaragua (present-day Léogâne, Haiti). Her name was derived from the Taíno words ana, meaning flower, and caona, meaning "gold". She was the sister of Bohechío, cacique of Jaragua. Anacaona had a reputation as a beautiful, cultured, and kind woman. She was trained in zemi interpretation, for which she was highly respected, and was an acclaimed composer and poet. Her compositions were commonly performed at areítos. None of her writings survive.

Both the Greater Antilles and the Lesser Antilles were historically sites of considerable cultural diversity, but a common distinction is often made between the Taíno people of the Greater Antilles and the Kalinago of the Lesser Antilles. Several Kalinago groups launched military incursions into Hispaniola during the late 15th century, and in 1470, Caonabo, a cacique from the Lucayos (now The Bahamas), conquered the cacicazgo of Maguana, which bordered Jaragua. In response to these Kalinago incursions, many Taíno caciques began pursuing political alliances with each other, and as of 1475, Bohechío was consolidating his own rule in territories to the west of Jaragua. As a result, he arranged a political marriage between Anacaona and Caonabo. The exact nature of their relationship is unknown. Caonabo had many wives, and it is possible that Anacaona was among the highest-ranked of them. It is known that the couple had one daughter: Higuenamota. Anacaona only stayed with Caonabo for short intervals, spending most of her time in Jaragua with Bohechío.

== Arrival of the Spanish ==
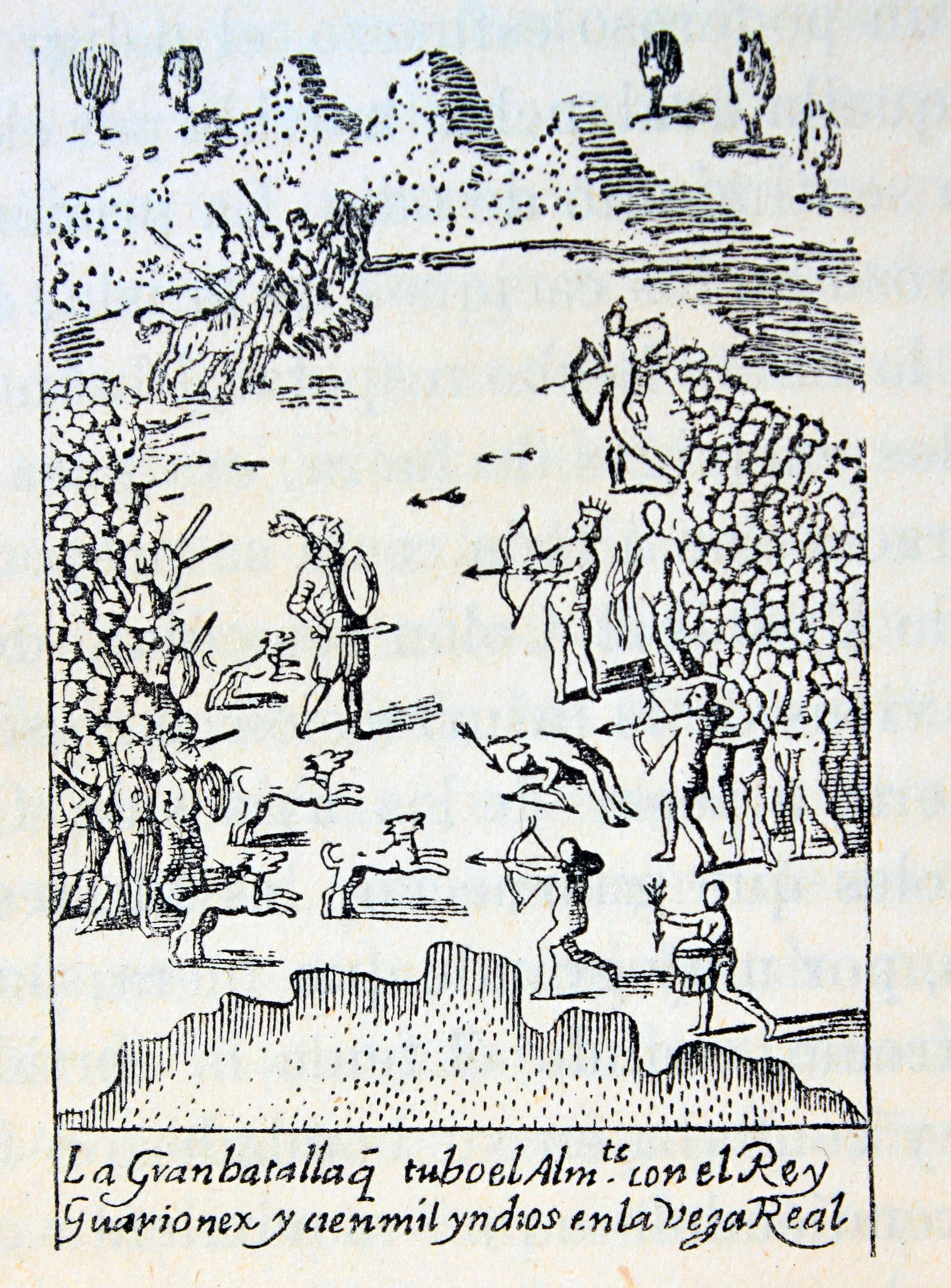
Illustration depicting the Battle of Vega Real, during which Anacona's husband, Caonabo, was captured

An expedition led by explorer Christopher Columbus first arrived in Hispaniola on 24 December 1492, when his flagship, the Santa María, crashed on the north coast of the island. Guacanagaríx, cacique of Marién, welcomed him and provided the members of the expedition with shelter. Columbus left behind 38 of his men in Marién at a fort called La Navidad. By the time Columbus returned to Hispaniola in 1493, La Navidad had been destroyed. Guacanagaríx gave various accounts of La Navidad's destruction, ultimately claiming that Caonabo had destroyed the fort, possibly as a result of abuses perpetrated against Taíno women and possibly because he resented Guacanagaríx's perceived alliance with the Spanish. Columbus ordered the construction of the town of La Isabela in 1494 and traveled south after hearing rumors that there were gold and settlements there. Conflict arose between the Spanish and the Taíno when the Spanish began enslaving Taínos for forced construction labor. Caonabo fought back against the Spanish, and in 1496, conquistador Alonso de Ojeda was dispatched to capture him. At the Battle of Vega Real, he succeeded, and Caonabo was banished from Hispaniola, dying soon after.

Christopher left the administration of the colony to his brother Bartholomew in 1496. Bartholomew entered Jaragua, where he was welcomed by Anacaona and Bohechío. Historian Maria Isabel Cabrera Bosch speculates that Anacaona held considerable authority over the cacicazgo's administration. Bartholomew demanded tribute, which Bohechío agreed to pay in cassava bread and cotton. In 1497, Bartholomew returned to Jaraugua, where he was again received by Anacona and Bohechío, to collect this tribute. A lavish feast was thrown for him, and the tribute was presented. The Spanish then transported the tribute up the coast, accompanied by Anacaona and Bohechío. At some point along the way, Anacaona stopped at a "little hamlet" that belonged to her. According to historian Bartolomé de las Casas, the hamlet was "full of a thousand things made of cotton, and seats and many vessels and things of service in the house, made of wood, marvelously worked". She gifted many of these items to Bartholomew. Anthropologist Samuel M. Wilson speculates that this may be indicative of women's role as producers and stewards of luxury goods in Taíno society. Las Casas also claims that when the party reached Port-au-Prince Bay, Anacaona, who possessed a large, well-decorated canoe, chose instead to ride in Bartholomew's boat to meet the Spanish ships. Meanwhile, historian Peter Martyr d'Anghiera indicates she had a separate canoe for herself and her followers.

== Reign ==
After Bohechío died in 1500 without issue, Anacaona succeeded him as cacica of Jaragua. Martyr claims that after Bohechío's death, Anacona had her brother's "most beautiful" wife buried alive alongside him and was reportedly prevented from burying others in the same manner by a Franciscan friar. This was allegedly a common practice among Taíno at the time. By that point, the territory of Jaragua extended eastward to the Neyba and Ozama Rivers in the modern-day Dominican Republic. While the Spanish continued to mistreat the Taíno, enslaving them to work in Spanish mines, Anacona initially continued Bohechío's policy of cooperating with them. Though, as rebellions against the Spanish grew more frequent, many enslaved Taínos fled to Jaragua seeking safety.

Refugees from a 1497 rebellion initiated by Spaniard Francisco Roldán against members of the Columbus family also fled to Jaragua, where they settled amongst the Taíno. According to historian Diomedes Núñez Polanco, Anacaona married Roldán, and Higuenamota, her daughter, entered into a romantic relationship with Spaniard Hernando de Guevara, who later led an uprising against Roldán. Academic Cecile Accilien claims that the Spanish disapproved of the relationship between Higuenamota and de Guevara, ultimately resulting in de Guevara's death.

== Death ==
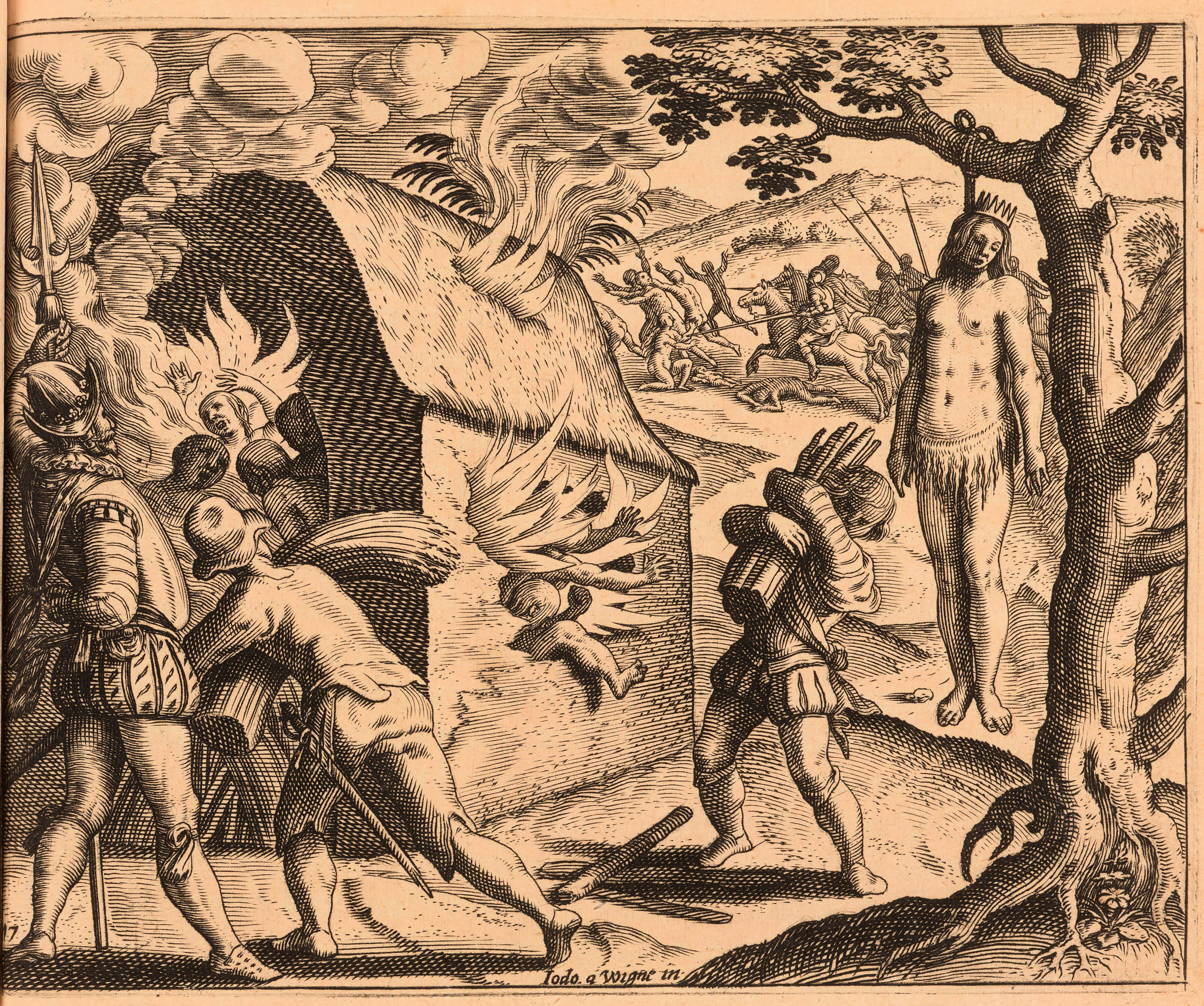
Massacre of the queen and her subjects, by Joos van Winghe, from A Short Account of the Destruction of the Indies by Bartolomé de las Casas.

In 1501, Nicolás de Ovando was appointed governor of Hispaniola, arriving on the island in 1502. Ovando reorganized Hispaniola, setting aside large tracts of land in Higüey, Vega Real, and Jaragua for food production. After subduing the people of Higüey, he traveled to Jaragua in 1503 with a contingent of 300 men. Anacaona received him. According to Las Casas, she "ordered all of the senores of that kingdom and all the people of their towns to come to her city of Xaragua to receive, celebrate, and give their reverence to the Guamiquina [great lord] of the Christians".

After this, Ovando lured between 40 and 80 caciques into a hut and burned them alive. (Note: "More than 40" according to Fumagalli and 80 according to Wilson.) Anacona was then taken to Santo Domingo, where she was imprisoned and tortured for three months. She was then hanged, according to Las Casas, to "show her honor". Various reasons have been proposed for this. Amongst early historians, Las Casas claims that the Spanish regularly committed such massacres to "instill and engender fear". Gonzalo Fernández de Oviedo y Valdés claims that Ovando went to Jaragua to quash a secret rebellion planned by the caciques. Meanwhile, Antonio de Herrera y Tordesillas suggests Ovando realized he was about to be attacked as Anacaona's guest and acted in self-defense. Some modern historians, such as Juan Pérez de Tudela, Ursula Lamb, and Troy S. Floyd, claim that Ovando massacred the caciques because they had been avoiding demands for food and mine laborers. Historian Nathalie Frederic Pierre claims that the massacre stemmed from the preponderance of refugees living in the mountains of Jaragua, a region Ovando viewed as an escape route for enslaved workers.

== Legacy ==
Anacaona in chains, from A History of the Life and Voyages of Christopher Columbus by Washington Irving

In the years since Anacaona's death, writers and artists have since used her memory to advance various positions. Alfred, Lord Tennyson wrote the poem "Anacona" while attending Trinity College, Cambridge, first reciting it in 1830, though it was not formally published until 1897, two years after his death. Independent scholar Marion Sherwood describes "Anacaona" as an "escapist fantasy" that portrays Anacaona as an "Other" living in an Edenic, natural paradise. According to Sherwood, Tennyson's "Anacaona" reflects Tennyson's ambivalence or hostility towards the Spanish Empire while romanticizing Anacaona as a "noble savage".

Between 1879 and 1882, Manuel de Jesús Galván published Enriquillo, which features Anacaona as a character. In the novel, Higuenamota marries Hernando de Guevara and takes the name Doña Ana. She is the grandmother of the novel's protagonist, Enriquillo. In 1880, Dominican writer Salomé Ureña wrote the poem "Anacaona", which featured Anacaona as the protagonist. Literary scholar Maria Cristina Fumagalli argues that this poem subtly promotes Hispanic identity over a broader pan-Hispaniolan or multi-ethnic perspective, projecting modern national borders onto a historical landscape.

In the late 20th century, Anacaona became a popular figure in Caribbean music. The Salsa song "Anacaona", originally performed by Tite Curet Alonso and popularized in the United States by Cheo Feliciano in 1971, was among the earliest examples of this trend. The song tells the story of Anacaona using lyrical fragments interspersed with a montuno based on the "Areíto de Anacaona", an areito that was allegedly played by warriors to pay her homage. Writer Olivia Tracy argues that this song helped to foster an embrace of Indigenous identity within the Chicano Movement. Other tributes to Anacaona in song include "Anakaona" by Ansy and Yole Dérose, released in 1983; and "Anacaona" by Irka Mateo, released in 2009.

Haitian neurologist, poet, novelist and playwright Jean Métellus published a play titled Anacaona in 1986. The play depicts Anacaona as a strong Taíno leader who uses her voice to establish peace via her marriage to Caonabó. The play concludes with Anacaona's death, as her "right hand", Yaquimex, prepares to flee into the mountains of Jaragua to incite a rebellion amongst African slaves. Fumagalli argues that Anacaona serves as a reappropriation and celebration of Hispaniola's Indigenous history and its creolizing influences. She further argues that the play is a critique of the regimes of François and Jean-Claude Duvalier, critiquing their Afrocentrism by emphasizing interethnic and interracial collaborations. Meanwhile, Tracy argues that through Anacaona, Métellus is reinterpreting history to suggest a direct connection between Anacaona's resistance and that of enslaved Africans, encouraging contemporary Haitians to adopt a defiant stance against ongoing oppression and deceit.

In 2005, Haitian-American author Edwidge Danticat published the young adult novel Anacaona: Golden Flower, Haiti, 1490, which tells the story of Anacona's life in the form of a fictional diary. Pierre notes this as the most notable work of literature about Anacaona. In the novel, Anacaona is depicted as a skilled poet, cultural figure, and active participant in resistance, engaging in physical combat against the Spanish. Tracy, in analyzing the novel's themes, discusses how Danticat's novel portrays Anacaona as a complex leader, embodying both the preservation of culture through poetry and storytelling as well as active, physical resistance against oppression. Meanwhile, Fumagalli argues that Danticat's novel implicitly and problematically prioritizes a "Haitian narrative" by anachronistically superimposing modern Haitian national boundaries onto the historical geography of Anacaona's rule, thereby overlooking her broader significance to the entire island of Hispaniola and its transnational creole culture.

== See also ==
- Anti-colonialism
- Chiefdoms of Hispaniola
- Enriquillo
- Jaragua massacre
- List of Taínos
- Women Native American leaders

== Sources ==
- Accilien, Cécile (2006). "Anacona, the Golden Flower". In Accilien, Cécile; Adams, Jessica; Méléance, Elmide (eds.). Revolutionary Freedoms: A History of Survival, Strength, and Imagination in Haiti. Coconut Creek: Caribbean Studies Press. ISBN 978-1-58432-293-1.
- Altman, Ida (2018). "The Spanish Caribbean, 1492–1550". Oxford Research Encyclopedia of Latin American History. Oxford University Press. doi:10.1093/acrefore/9780199366439.013.630. ISBN 978-0-19-936643-9.
- Anderson-Córdova, Karen Frances (2017). Surviving Spanish Conquest: Indian Fight, Flight, and Cultural Transformation in Hispaniola and Puerto Rico. Tuscaloosa: The University of Alabama Press. ISBN 978-0-8173-9090-7.
- Arranz Márquez, Luis. "Anacaona". Historia Hispánica (in Spanish). Madrid: Real Academia de la Historia.
- Arrom, José J. (1980). "Taíno Mythology: Notes on the Supreme Being". Latin American Literary Review. 8 (16): 21–37. ISSN 0047-4134. JSTOR 20119208.
- Cabrera Bosch, Maria Isabel (2008). "Anacaona". In Smith, Bonnie G. (ed.). The Oxford Encyclopedia of Women in World History. Translated by Miller, Matthew. Oxford University Press.
- de las Casas, Bartolomé (2016) [c. late 16th century]. Historia de las Indias [History of the Indies] (in Spanish). Vol. 3. Project Gutenberg.
- Eller, Anne (2016). We Dream Together: Dominican Independence, Haiti, and the Fight for Caribbean Freedom. Durham: Duke University Press. ISBN 978-0-8223-7376-6.
- Fumagalli, Maria Cristina (2015). On the Edge: Writing the Border between Haiti and the Dominican Republic. Liverpool University Press. doi:10.5949/liverpool/9781781381601.001.0001. ISBN 978-1-78138-160-1.
- Gutierrez, Franklin A. (1998). "Enriquillo" de Manuel de Jesus Galvan: La construccion de un heroe (Doctoral thesis). New York – via ProQuest.
- Hall, Michael R., ed. (2012). "Léogâne". Historical Dictionary of Haiti. Lanham: Scarecrow. ISBN 978-0-8108-7810-5.
- Marulanda Villada, Gildardo (2024). Anacaona: Una leyenda taína [Anacaona: A Taino legend] (in Spanish). Bogotá: Universidad Distrital Francisco José de Caldas. ISBN 978-958-787-689-5.
- Núñez Polanco, Diomedes (1987). "El Caribe: pueblos, cultura e historia" [The Caribbean: peoples, culture and history]. Cuadernos Hispanoamericanos (in Spanish). 445: 79–94.
- Phillips, Carla Rahn (2007). "de Ovando, Nicolás". In Buisseret, David (ed.). The Oxford Companion to World Exploration. Oxford University Press.
- Pierre, N. Frederic (2016). "Anacaona". In Knight, Franklin W.; Gates, Jr., Henry Louis (eds.). Dictionary of Caribbean and Afro–Latin American Biography. Oxford University Press.
- Rondón, César Miguel (2008). The Book of Salsa: A Chronicle of Urban Music from the Caribbean to New York City. Chapel Hill: University of North Carolina Press. ISBN 978-0-8078-3129-8.
- Sherwood, Marion (2013). Tennyson and the Fabrication of Englishness. London: Palgrave Macmillan UK. doi:10.1057/9781137288905. ISBN 978-1-349-44999-6.
- Tracy, Olivia (2018). ""Rise Up through the Words": Postcolonial Haitian Uncoverings of Anacaona". Journal of Haitian Studies. 24 (1). Center for Black Studies Research: 101–126. ISSN 1090-3488. JSTOR 26527980.
- Wilson, Samuel M. (1990). Hispaniola: Caribbean Chiefdoms in the Age of Columbus. Tuscaloosa: University of Alabama Press. ISBN 0-8173-0462-2.
