= Taíno genocide =

Mass murder by the Spanish during their colonization of the Caribbean

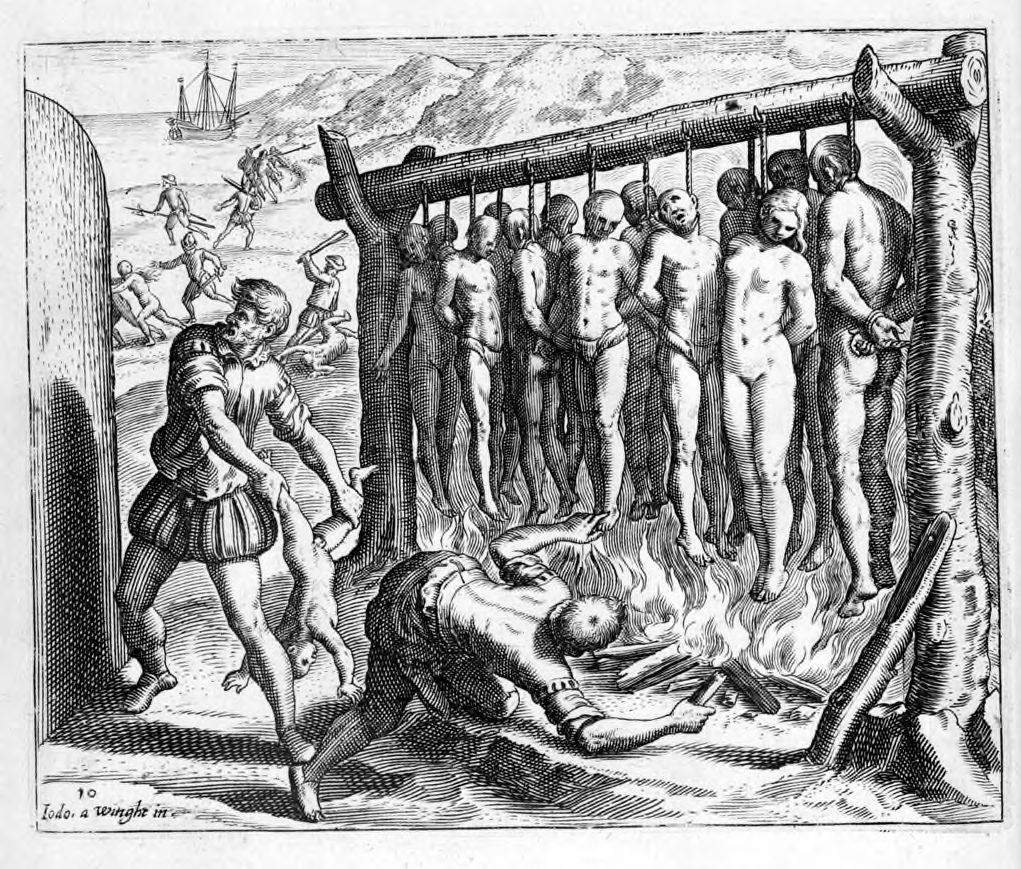
- A 16th-century illustration by Flemish Protestant Theodor de Bry for Bartolomé de las Casas' Brevísima relación de la destrucción de las Indias, depicting Spanish torture and murder of Indigenous peoples during the conquest of Hispaniola.
- Location: West Indies
- Date: 1493–1550
- Target: Taíno
- Attack type: Genocide, mass murder, forced displacement, ethnic cleansing, slavery, starvation, collective punishment, torture, genocidal rape, forced conversion, cultural genocide
- Deaths: 8,000 to 900,000; Between 80% and 90% of the Taíno population died in the first 30 years.
- Perpetrator: Spanish Empire
- Motive: Settler colonialism Spanish imperialism Religious discrimination Eurocentrism (both cultural and physical); Proto-racism

The Taíno genocide was committed against the Taíno Indigenous people by the Spanish during their colonization of the Caribbean during the 16th century. The population of the Taíno before the arrival of the Spanish Empire on the island of Quisqueya or Ayití in 1492, which Christopher Columbus named Hispaniola (present-day Haiti and the Dominican Republic), is estimated to be between 10,000 and 1,000,000. Following the deposition of the last Taíno chief in 1504, the Spanish began subjecting the local population to slavery, massacres and other forms of violence. By 1514, the Taíno population had reportedly been reduced to about 32,000 people, by 1565 to 200, and by 1802 they were officially declared extinct by Spanish colonial authorities. However, mixed-race and other Taíno descendants continue to live, and their disappearance from records may be more the result of colonial classification practices than evidence of true extinction.

== History ==
The Taíno people were the descendants of the Arawak people who arrived in the Caribbean approximately 4,000 years before the conquest, and they lived in the Bahamas, the Greater Antilles and the Lesser Antilles. In 1492, Christopher Columbus was looking for a direct sea route connecting Europe to East Asia, hoping to open profitable oceangoing trade networks. When he landed on the island of San Salvador, he originally thought he had arrived in the islands of the East Indies. When he realized that he had stumbled upon a previously unknown continent, he began to consider other potential sources of profit, focusing primarily on gold and slaves. Upon arriving on Hispaniola, a confrontation occurred between the crew of the Santa María and the Taíno after the crew sexually abused Taíno women.

Although disease played a significant role in the decrease in the Taíno population, violence and famine were also important factors. The tribute system was imposed to gain gold and other goods, yet came with devastating effects for the Taíno population. The presence of the Spanish devastated crops and livestock further worsening the conditions for the Taínos and the Spanish. The Spanish began to run low on supplies. To fulfill the need for food, they would negotiate with caciques to provide food to the Spanish through a tribute system. Others found it easier to steal food from natives, thus worsening famine. Yet as conditions continued to worsen, caciques would refuse to pay tribute in protest. Spaniards would intentionally capture caciques to gain more control and power over the Taínos. As tensions between the Taíno and Spaniards grew, Taínos began to rebel against the Spanish more frequently, contributing to the Taíno death toll.

=== Hispaniola ===
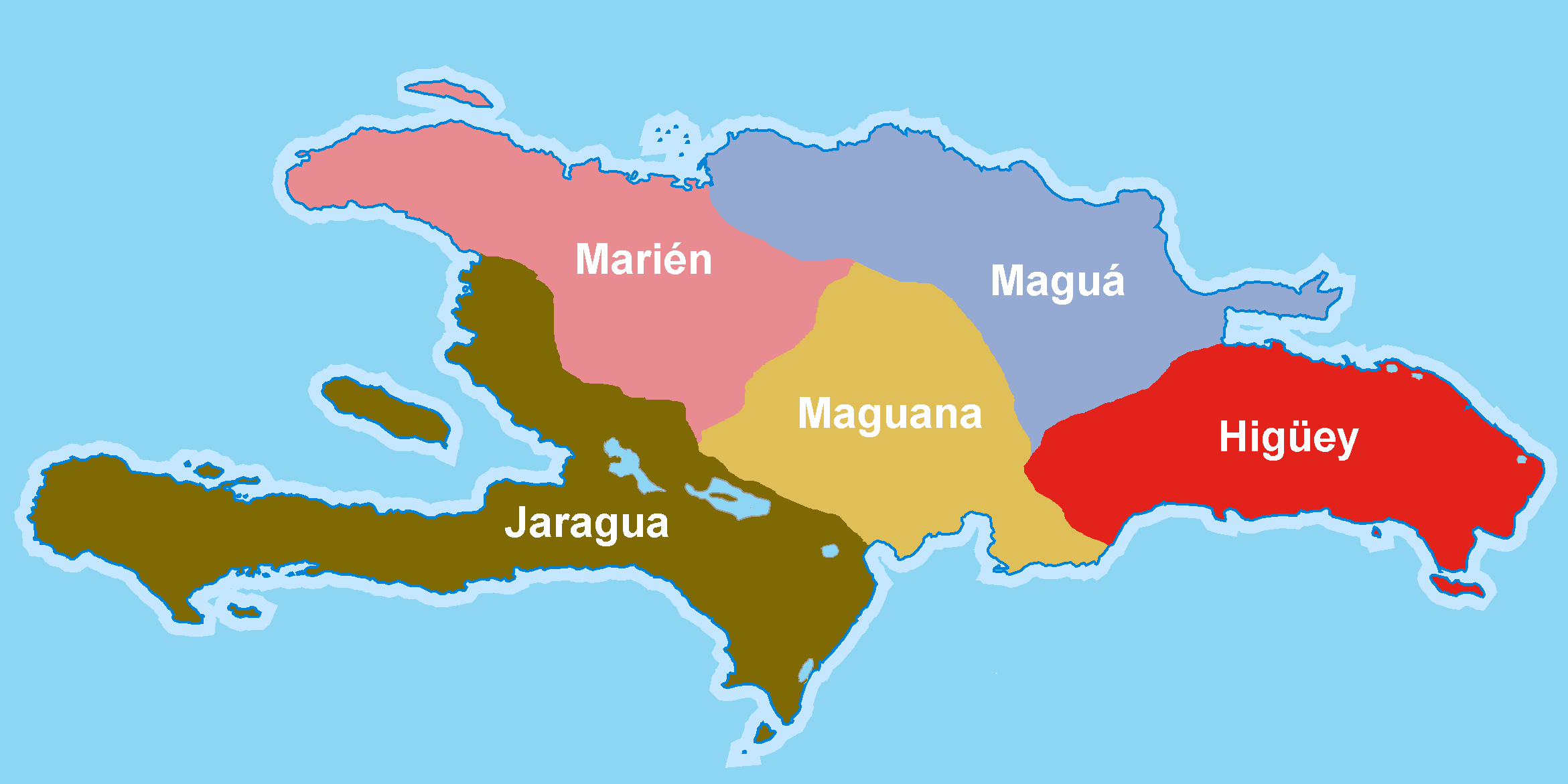
Chiefdoms of Hispaniola.

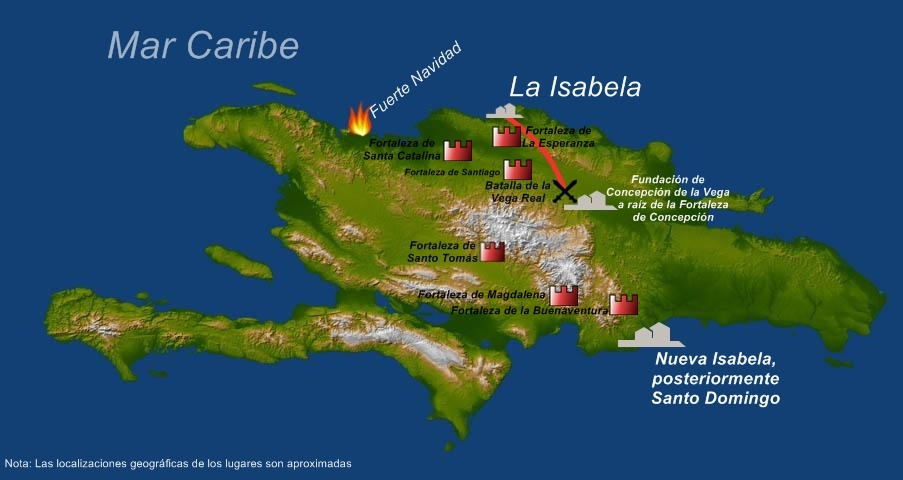
Spanish fortresses in Hispaniola.

When Columbus heard that Caonabo, the cacique in Maguana, was planning an attack, he sent four hundred men into the interior to attack and instill fear into the natives, further increasing tensions.

In one instance in early 1495, a subchief killed ten people and set fire to huts with sick Spaniards. In response, Christopher Columbus led an expedition resulting in the capture of over 1500 Taínos that were to be sent to Spain to be sold and an unknown number of deaths, resulting in the first open form of enslavement in Hispaniola. Since only 150 could fit on the ships, according to Michele Cuneo, by Columbus’s orders, “whoever wanted them could take as many as he please,” resulting in over 600 being allotted to Spaniards. The remaining 400 were to be released and around half the captives aboard the ship died.

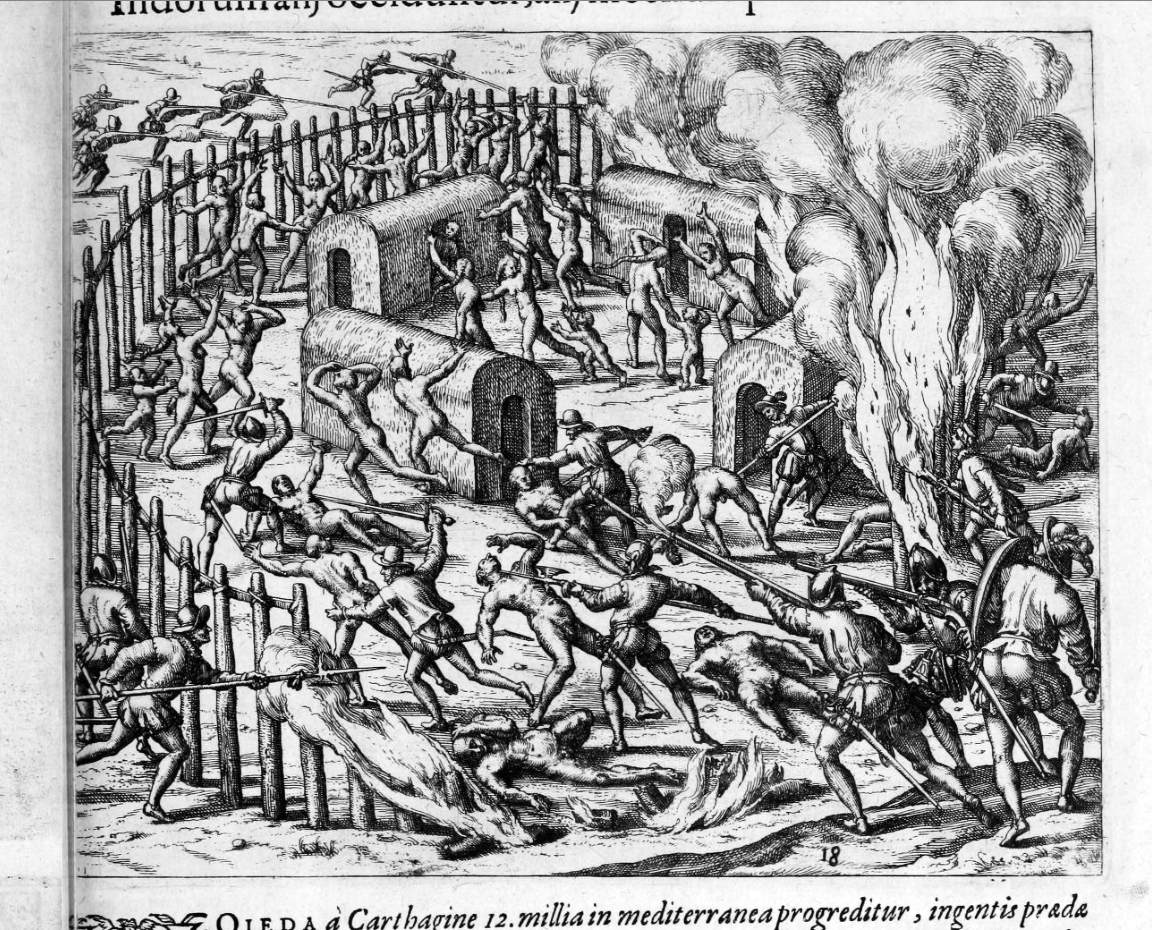
Alonso de Ojeda murders Indians in hopes of finding gold, by Theodor de Bry.

At the end of February 1495, Caonabo led an expedition against Magdalena and Santo Tomas, which would be held under siege for a month. Sometime after, Caonabo would be captured by Alonso de Ojeda. The capture of Caonabo angered many Taínos, resulting in an alliance between caciques. On March 24, 1495, hundreds of soldiers and about 20 dogs gathered and killed many Taínos and captured Caonabo’s brother, resulting in Vega Real being under Spanish control. Caonabo and his brother were to be sent to Spain as prisoners, yet they died either during the voyage or when a hurricane hit La Isabela’s harbor. Anacaona, Caonabo’s widow and Behechio’s sister, would return to Jaragua to govern with her brother, the current cacique, where she later became a cacica. According to Ferdinand Columbus, the attack “improved the position of the Christians... He [Christoper Columbus] reduced the Indians to such obedience and tranquility that they all promised to pay tribute.” Christopher Columbus ordered people 14 years old and older near the gold mines to provide gold and everyone else twenty-five pounds of cotton. Those who paid tribute were required to wear a token on his neck and anyone found without one was subject to punishment.

In a visit to Jaragua, Bartolome Columbus requested tribute from Behecchio and Anacaona. Beheccio lied, claiming they could not pay tribute because his people do not know where gold can be found or what it is, and that Jaragua did not have gold. Since the Spanish struggled to feed their people, the value of food was very high. They agreed to provide goods like cotton, cassava, and dried fish.

==== Jaragua Massacre ====
Enslavement throughout Hispaniola resulted in many rebellions and many Taínos fleeing to Jaragua since 1496. Samuel M. Wilson, archaeologist and historical anthropologist, suggests the Jaragua massacre was carried out not to suppress rebellion but to "subjugate a somewhat separatist community."

In 1503, when Anacaona, now governing Jaragua after the death of her brother in 1502, received news that Nicolás de Ovando was arriving to Jaragua she gathered local Taino leaders and caciques, and people from surrounding towns to Jaragua. Ovando took with him 300 soldiers and 70 horsemen. It is said many came and celebrated with feasts, dance, and games. Bartolomé de las Casas wrote about the Jaragua massacre in Historia de las Indias. According to las Casas, one Sunday, Ovando told all the leaders to gather at Anacaona’s home because she wished to speak with them. When they arrived him and his men drew their swords on Anacaona and some eighty leaders. They were all bound and Anacaona was carried out of her home. The Spaniards then blocked all exits and set fire to her home. Locals and individuals who came to Jaragua for the reception were killed, disemboweled, impaled, and dismembered. Horsemen ran through the town attacking Taínos with a pike. Spaniards that resided in Jaragua also were attacked, approximately 50 were killed during this massacre. Las Casas reported, some Spaniards placed children on their horses, he was unsure if it was either to shield them or to kill the children themselves, but horsemen rode behind them and impaled them. When the children fell from the horses, the Spaniards would hold them to the ground and cut off their legs.

The end of Anacaona's life is contested. Some sources suggest she was hung by Spaniards instead of burning with the other leaders as a sign of respect. Some sources say she was taken to Santo Domingo for trial, where she was later hung after three months. Few sources, mainly French, say she was tortured in Santo Domingo before she was hung.

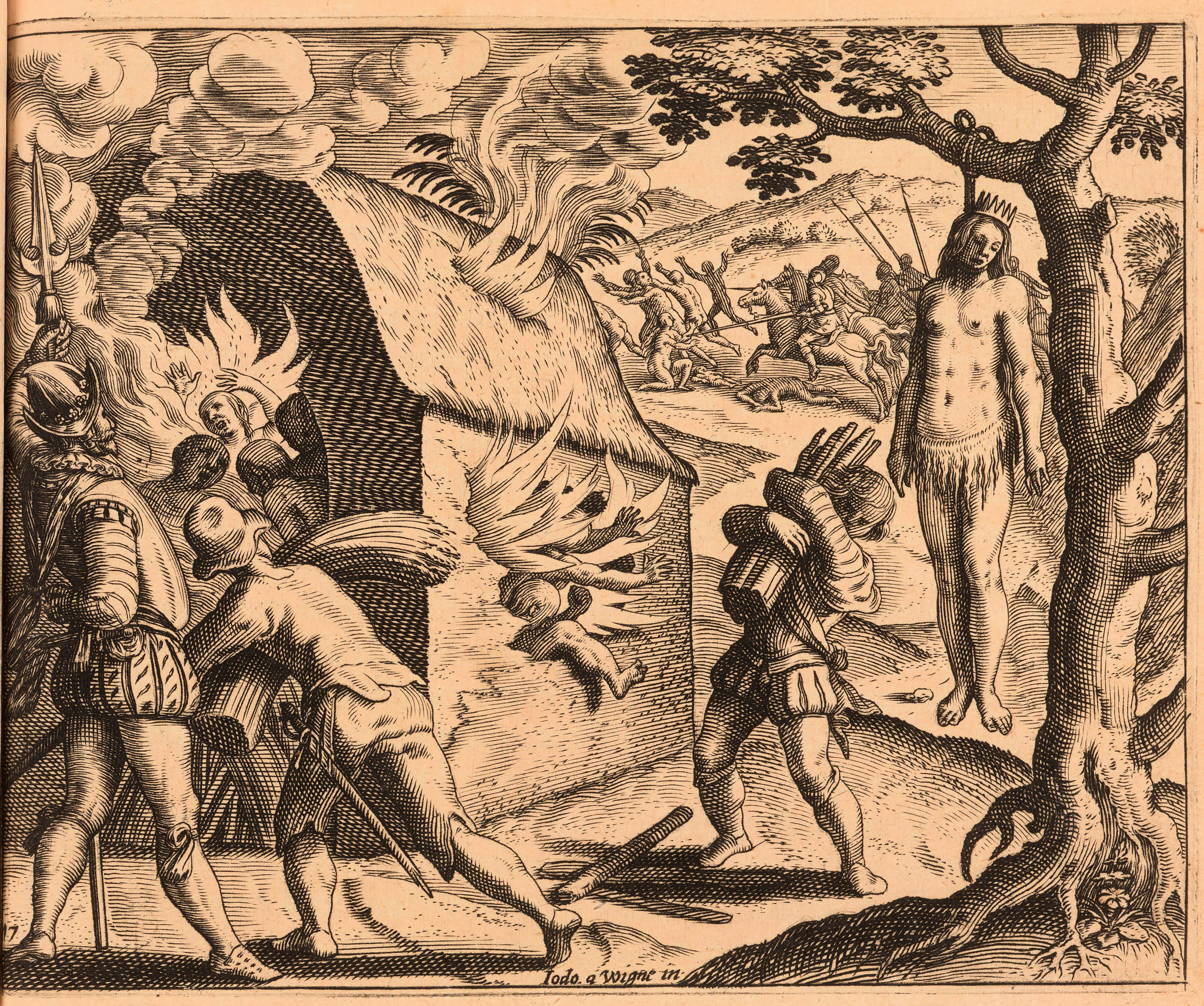
The Massacre of Queen Anacaona and Her Subjects. Illustrated by Joos van Winghe, engraved by Theodor de Bry, for the first Latin edition of A Short Account of the Destruction of the Indies by Bartolome de las Casas.

For several months after the massacre, Nicolás de Ovando continued a campaign of persecution against the Taíno until their numbers became very small, according to historian Samuel M. Wilson in his book Hispaniola. Caribbean Chiefdoms in the Age of Columbus. The Taíno suffered physical abuse in the gold mines and sugar cane fields, as well as religious persecution during the Spanish Inquisition, along with the exposure to diseases that arrived with the colonizers. Others were captured and taken to Spain to be traded as slaves, which resulted in numerous deaths due to poor human conditions during the journey.

In thirty years, between 80% and 90% of the Taíno population died. Because of the increased number of people (Spanish) on the island, there was a higher demand for food. Taíno cultivation was converted to Spanish methods. In hopes of frustrating the Spanish, some Taínos refused to plant or harvest their crops. The supply of food became so low in 1495 and 1496 that some 50,000 died from famine. Some historians have determined that the massive decline was due more to infectious disease outbreaks than any warfare or direct attacks. By 1507, their numbers had shrunk to 60,000. Scholars believe that epidemic disease (smallpox, influenza, measles, and typhus) was an overwhelming cause of the population decline of the Indigenous people, and also attributed a "large number of Taíno deaths...to the continuing bondage systems" that existed.

== Academic discourse ==
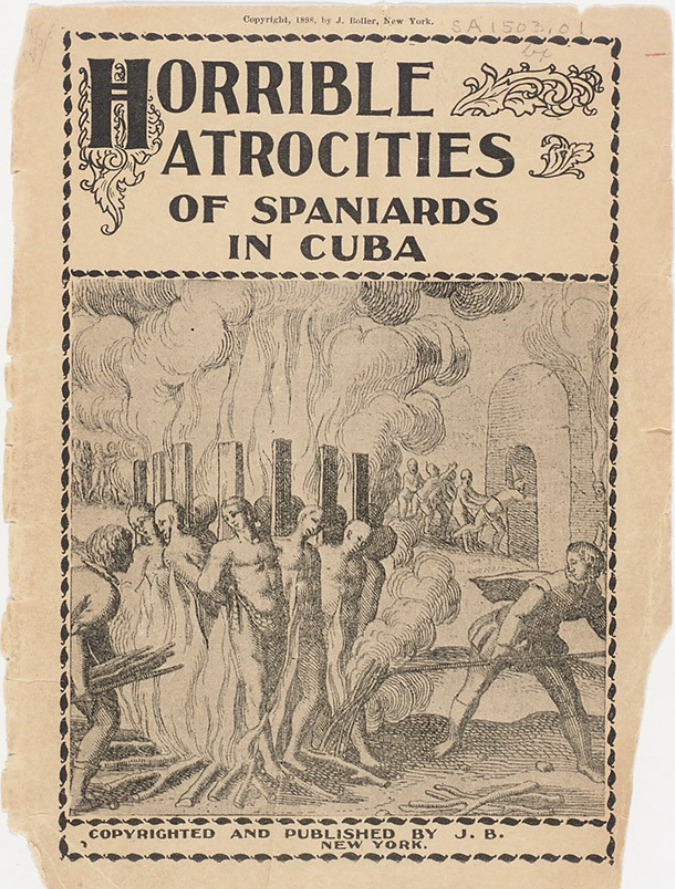
Spanish burning of Native Americans, from A Short Account of the Destruction of the Indies

Academics, such as historian Andrés Reséndez of the University of California, Davis, assert that disease alone does not explain the destruction of Indigenous populations of Hispaniola. While the populations of Europe rebounded following the devastating population decline associated with the Black Death, there was no such rebound for the Indigenous populations of the Caribbean. He concludes that, even though the Spanish were aware of deadly diseases such as smallpox, there is no mention of them in the New World until 1519, meaning perhaps they did not spread as fast as initially believed, and that, unlike Europeans, the Indigenous populations were subjected to enslavement, exploitation, and forced labor in gold and silver mines on an enormous scale. Reséndez says that "slavery has emerged as a major killer" of the Indigenous people of the Caribbean. Anthropologist Jason Hickel estimates that the lethal forced labor in these mines killed a third of the Indigenous people there every six months.

Subsequently, in the United States, Yale University classified the atrocities which the Spanish Empire committed against the Taíno as a "genocide" and it also included the Taíno genocide in its Genocide Studies Program.

Raphael Lemkin considered Spain's abuses of the native population of the Americas to constitute cultural and even outright genocide including the abuses of the encomienda system. University of Hawaii historian David Stannard describes the encomienda as a genocidal system which "had driven many millions of native peoples in Central and South America to early and agonizing deaths." Scholars Bridget Conley and Alex de Waal highlight the weaponisation of starvation employed by conquistadors against the Taíno as being a contributing factor to the genocide, and historian Harald E. Braun highlights the Jaragua massacre in 1503 as a case of genocidal massacre.

== See also ==
- 1804 Haitian massacre
- Jaragua massacre
- Colonialism and genocide
- Genocide of indigenous peoples
- Genocides in history
- Indigenous peoples of the Caribbean
- Indigenous response to colonialism
- List of ethnic cleansing campaigns
- List of genocides
- List of massacres in Haiti
- Outline of genocide studies
