= Battle of Vega Real =

1495 battle on the island of Haiti

- Part of Spanish colonization of the Americas
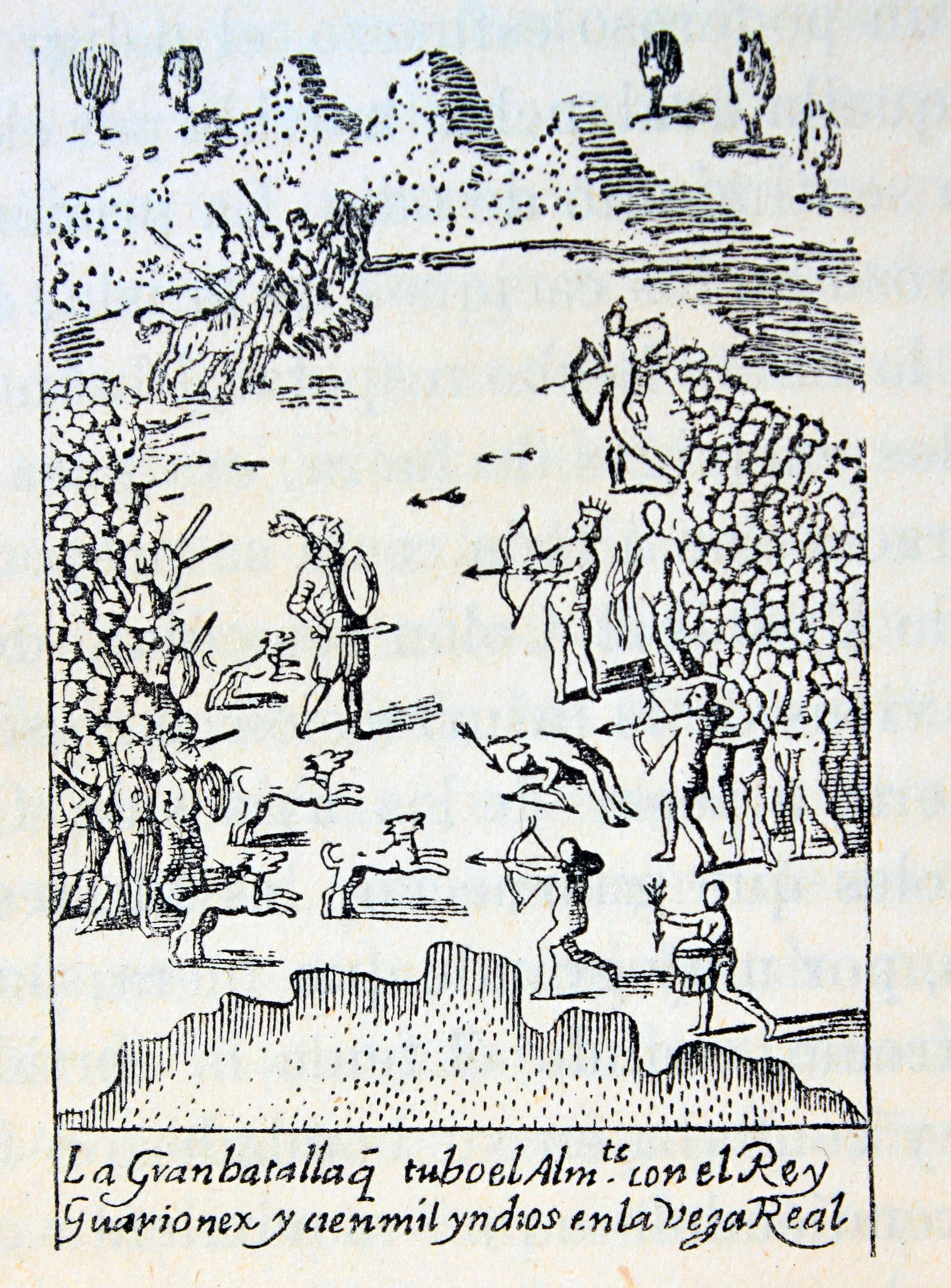
Date	March 24, 1495
Location	Concepción de La Vega, Hayti (named Hispaniola by Columbus), Columbian Viceroyalty
Result	Decisive Castilian victory Hispaniola pacified

Belligerents
Crown of Castile; Cacicazgo of Marién	Chiefdom of Maguana; Cacicazgo de Maguá; Chiefdom of Higüey; Chiefdom of Jaragua

Commanders and leaders
Christopher Columbus; Bartholomew Columbus; Alonso de Ojeda; Guacanagaríx	Caonabo (POW); Guarionex; Cayacoa; Bohechío

Strength
220 men 20 greyhounds Several hundreds of auxiliary natives	≈10,000 (several thousands)

Casualties and losses
no men killed	Dozens killed

The Battle of Vega Real, also called the Battle of the Holy Hill or the Battle of Jáquimo, took place on 24 March 1495 on the island of Hayti between an indigenous alliance and Spanish forces, commanded by Christopher Columbus, Bartholomew Columbus and Alonso de Ojeda, with the help of indigenous people led by Guacanagaríx. The battle resulted in the defeat and capture of the Taíno leader Caonabo, ending indigenous resistance on Hayti.
