= Guarionex =

Indigenous cacique of Hispaniola

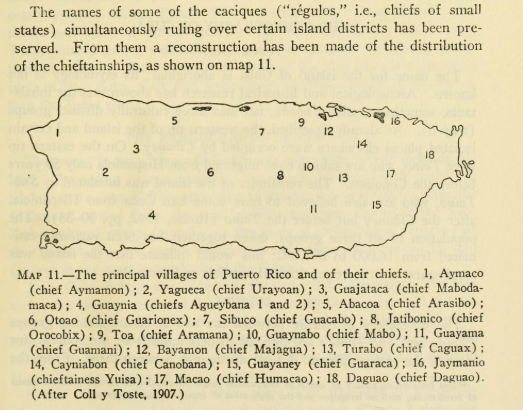
- Smithsonian 1901 map of Puerto Rico caciques

Cacique of Maguá
- Reign: c. 1492 - 1502
- Born: Maguá, Hispaniola
- Died: 1502
- Father: Guacanagarix

Guarionex (Taíno language: "The Brave Noble Lord") was an Indigenous cacique (Taíno chief) from Maguá in the island of Hispaniola at the time of the arrival of the Europeans to the Western Hemisphere in 1492. He was the son of cacique Guacanagarix, the great Taíno prophet who had the vision of the coming of the Guamikena (White Men).

Since 1494 the Spaniards had imposed heavy tributes on the Taino population of Hispaniola. In 1495, Taino led by Caonabo raised up in arms but were crushed by Bartholomew Columbus. Guarionex then opted for accommodation and appeasement but by 1497 the situation had deteriorated further. Guarionex then sided with Spanish rebel Francisco Roldán and set out to attack the Spaniards. Columbus assembled his troops and attacked Guarionex's camp at night by surprise. The cacique was captured and his warriors dispersed. Guarionex was later released by Columbus and went back to his policy of appeasement. At one point he could not hold on to power and fled to the north of the island. The Spaniards captured him there and sent him in chains to Spain in 1502, but the ship sank during a storm. Lost was a fortune in gold said by Bartolomé de las Casas to be worth 3600 castilians.

Another cacique also called Guarionex was also present as a vassal of the cacique Guaybaná in Puerto Rico between 1508 and 1511.

== In popular media ==
Cacique Guariones is mentioned in a Puerto Rican décima in the Journal of American Folk-lore volume 31, published in 1918.

== See also ==
- Chiefdoms of Hispaniola
- List of Puerto Ricans
- Agüeybaná
- Agüeybaná II
- List of Taínos
- Arasibo
- Hayuya
- Jumacao
- Orocobix
- Tibes Indigenous Ceremonial Center
