= Jaragua massacre =

Spanish entrap natives in Hispanolia in July 1503

The Jaragua massacre of July 1503, was the killing of Indigenous people from the town of Xaragua on the island of Hispaniola. It was ordered by the Spanish governor of Santo Domingo, Nicolás de Ovando, during a Native celebration that was held in the village of Guava near present-day Léogane in the territory of Jaragua of the Cacica Anacaona.

== History ==
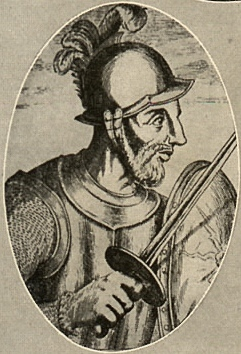
Eighteenth-century depiction of de Ojeda.

The sociopolitical structure of the island was thought to have been organized under five Chiefdoms or Cacicazgos. Recent studies however suggest that there may have been well over 30 Chiefdoms and that the 5 which were recorded by Las Casas were the ones who made contact with the Spanish upon their arrival. The Chiefdom of Jaragua was under Cacique Boechio. After Boechío's alleged death of old age, his sister, Anacaona, emerged as successor and intermediate between the natives of Jaragua and the Spanish. She was reputed to have been an efficient administrator, a beautiful woman and highly respected. At that time the Spanish had an alliance with the Chiefdom of Marien through Guacanagaríx. Guacanagarix told the Spanish that the tribe of Jaragua was planning a rebellion. Although Anacaona had always paid her tribute she was then considered a threat by the governor. According to Las Casas in 1503 Ovando advised Anacaona that he would visit the town of Xaragua with his men to celebrate their good relations. During the celebration Ovando and his men turned on the natives. Anacaona and her fellow native noblemen were arrested and accused of conspiracy and of trying to start a rebellion. Imprisoned, Anacaona answered with these verses:

It is not honorable to kill; nor can honor propitiate tragedy. Let us open a bridge of love, so that across it even our enemies may walk and leave for posterity their footprints.

Ovando had gone to Jaragua with 300 men plus many local natives of the tribe of Marien. Ovando allegedly enticed the Caciques that were present into a batey (large hut) to witness a tournament by Spaniards. He then gave a prearranged signal and the Spaniards seized and bound the caciques, while others fell on the Indians milling outside." Many of the Indians were thus killed, including 80 caciques burned alive, and Anacaona hanged. Las Casas records that there were children among the massacred. He writes that the Spanish slashed the legs off boys as they ran, and that even when some Spaniards tried to save a child by pulling them onto their horses, that another would come and "pierce the child with a lance."

Because of the massacre, King Ferdinand V deposed and recalled Ovando back to Spain in 1509. He died two years later, on 29 May 1511.

According to las Casas, some of those who escaped the massacre fled to the island of Guanabo, eight leagues away, but they were later rounded up and enslaved by the Spanish. (He also notes that one of these persons was given to him as a slave).

== See also ==
- Captaincy General of Santo Domingo
- Spanish West Indies
- Peter Martyr d'Anghiera
- List of massacres in Haiti
- List of genocides
