= Acul Bay =

- Baie de l'Acul (French)
- Location within Haiti
- Location: Haiti
- Coordinates: 19.7333°N 72.3333°W
- Type: Bay
- Part of: Caribbean Sea
- Max. length: 7 km (4.3 mi)
- Max. width: 10 km (6.2 mi)
- Surface area: 30 km^{2} (12 sq mi)

Acul Bay, also known as North Acul Bay, is a bay on the northern coast of Haiti, north of the city of Acul-du-Nord and west of the city of Cap-Haïtien.

== Geography ==
Acul Bay is open to the ocean on the North. It extends from the tip of Labadee to the East of Cape Balimbé West. Acul Bay gradually slopes and is nearly 5 kilometres (3.1 mi) in length and 2 kilometres (1.2 mi) in width, with a bottleneck in the middle of a width of about 500 metres (1,600 ft).

Out from the bay, many shoals emerge, forming numerous islets that are dangerous to navigation. Many shipwrecks dating back several centuries are stranded or lying at the bottom of the water. Among these islands, Rat Island was also named l'île La Amiga (Friendly Island) by Christopher Columbus because it was where he first encountered Guacanagaríx, who was a cacique of the indigenous Taino people, and established the settlement La Navidad.
