= La Isabela =

Historic site in the Dominican Republic

Coordinates: 19°53′14.40″N 71°04′49.50″W

- 1493–1500
- Flag Coat of arms

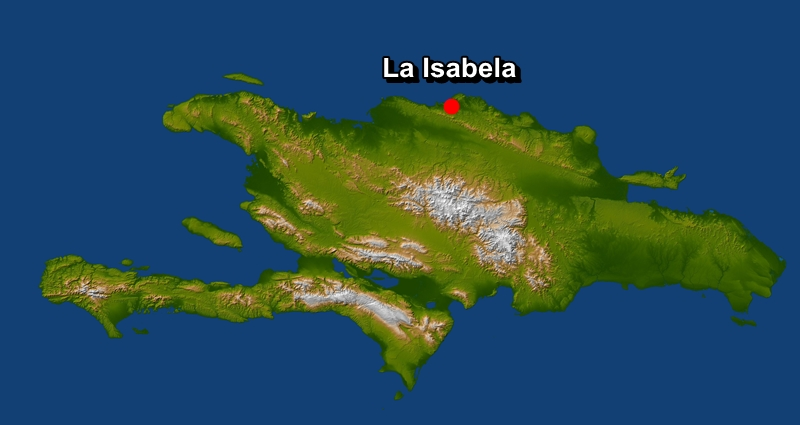
- Status: Settlement in the Columbian Viceroyalty
- Common languages: Spanish
- Viceroy
  - 1494-1500: Christopher Columbus
- Historical era: Age of Discovery
  - Established: 1493
  - Disestablished: 1500

Population
  - 1490s: 300
- Today part of: Dominican Republic

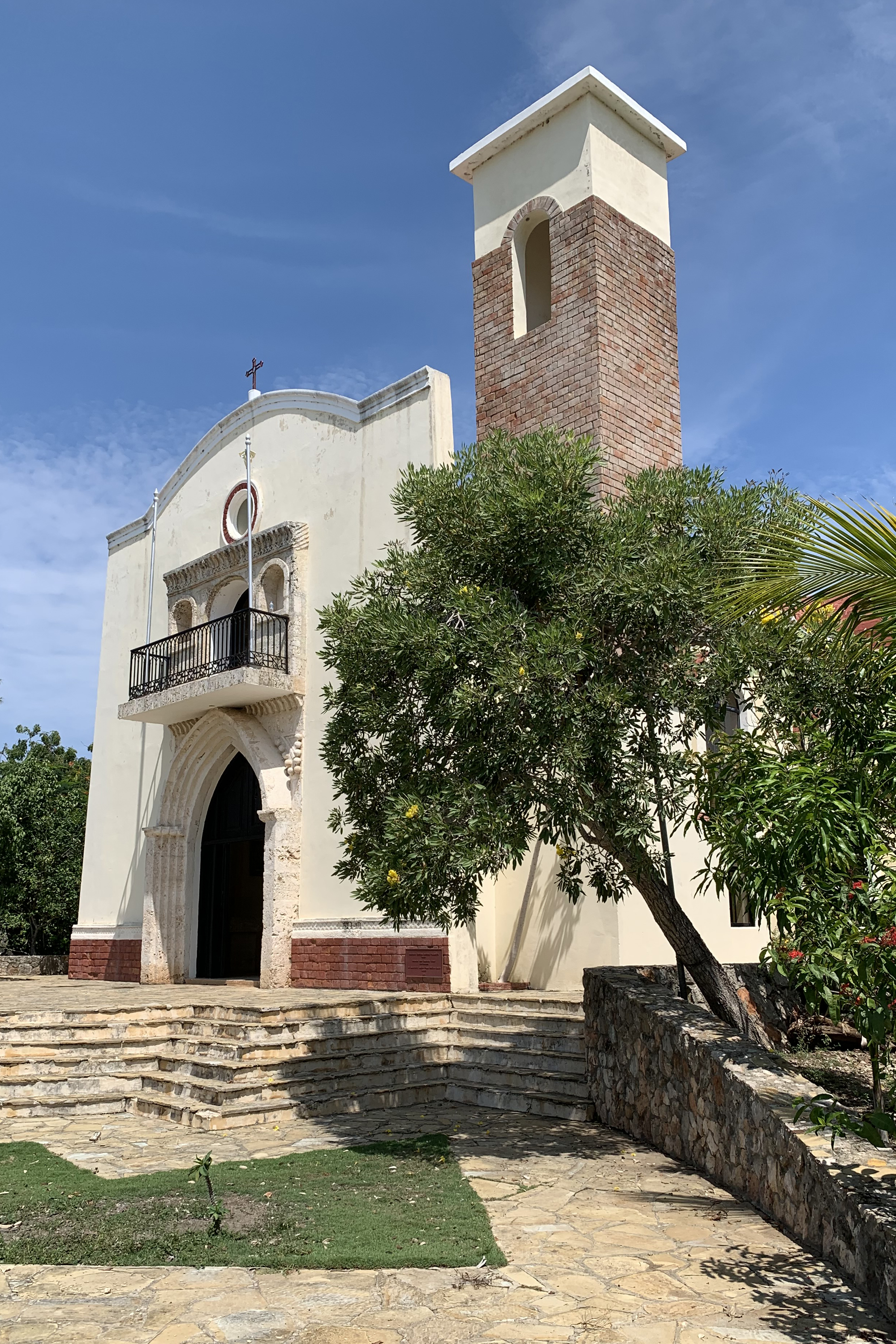
La Isabela church

La Isabela in Puerto Plata Province, Dominican Republic was the first stable Spanish settlement and town in the Americas. It was established in late December 1493 to early January 1494. The site is 42 km west of the city of Puerto Plata, adjacent to the village of El Castillo. The area now forms a National Historic Park.

La Isabela was founded by Christopher Columbus during his second voyage, and named after Queen Isabella I of Castile. The settlement of La Navidad, established by Columbus one year earlier to the west of La Isabela in what is present day Haiti, was destroyed by the native Taíno people before he returned. La Isabela was abandoned by 1500.

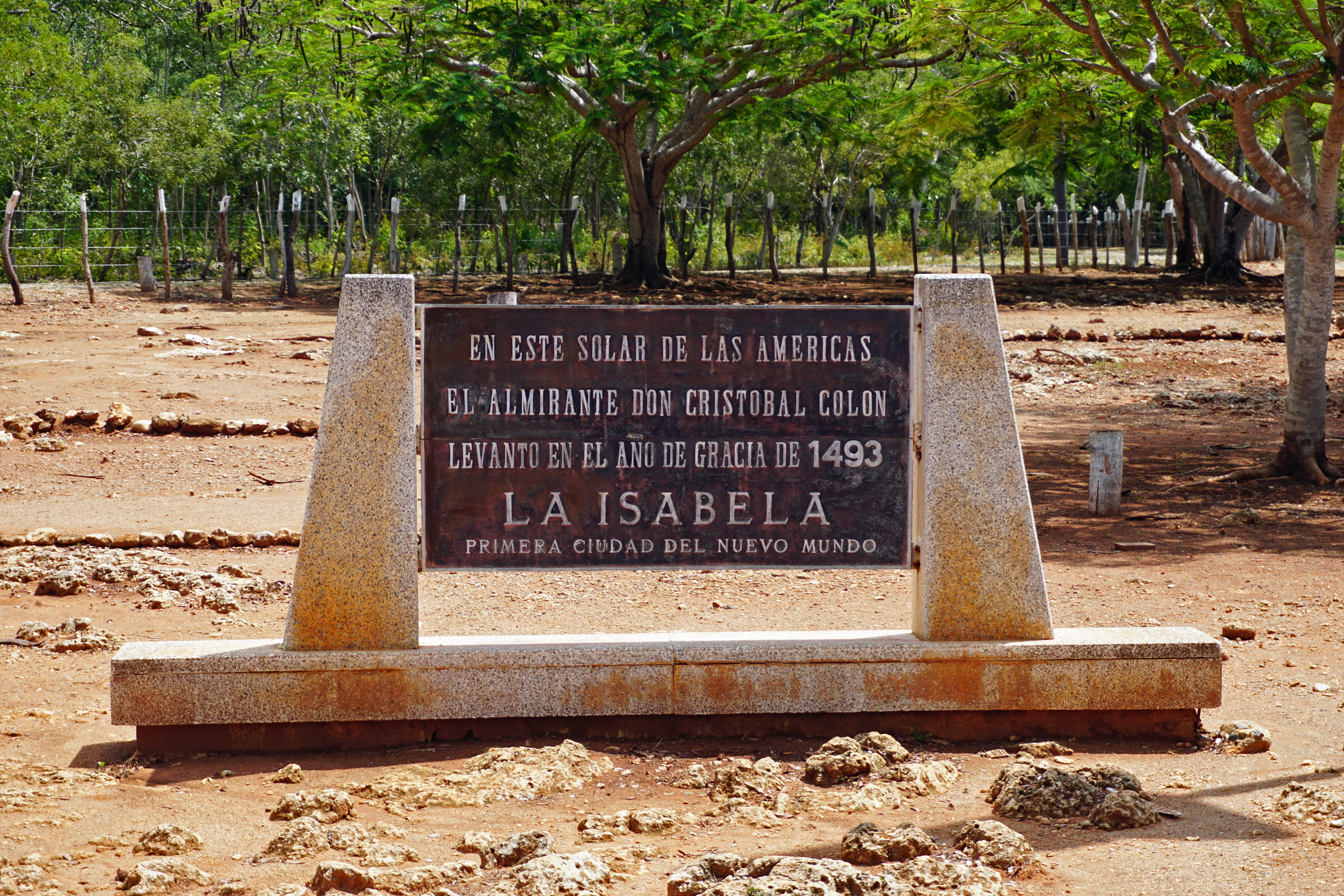
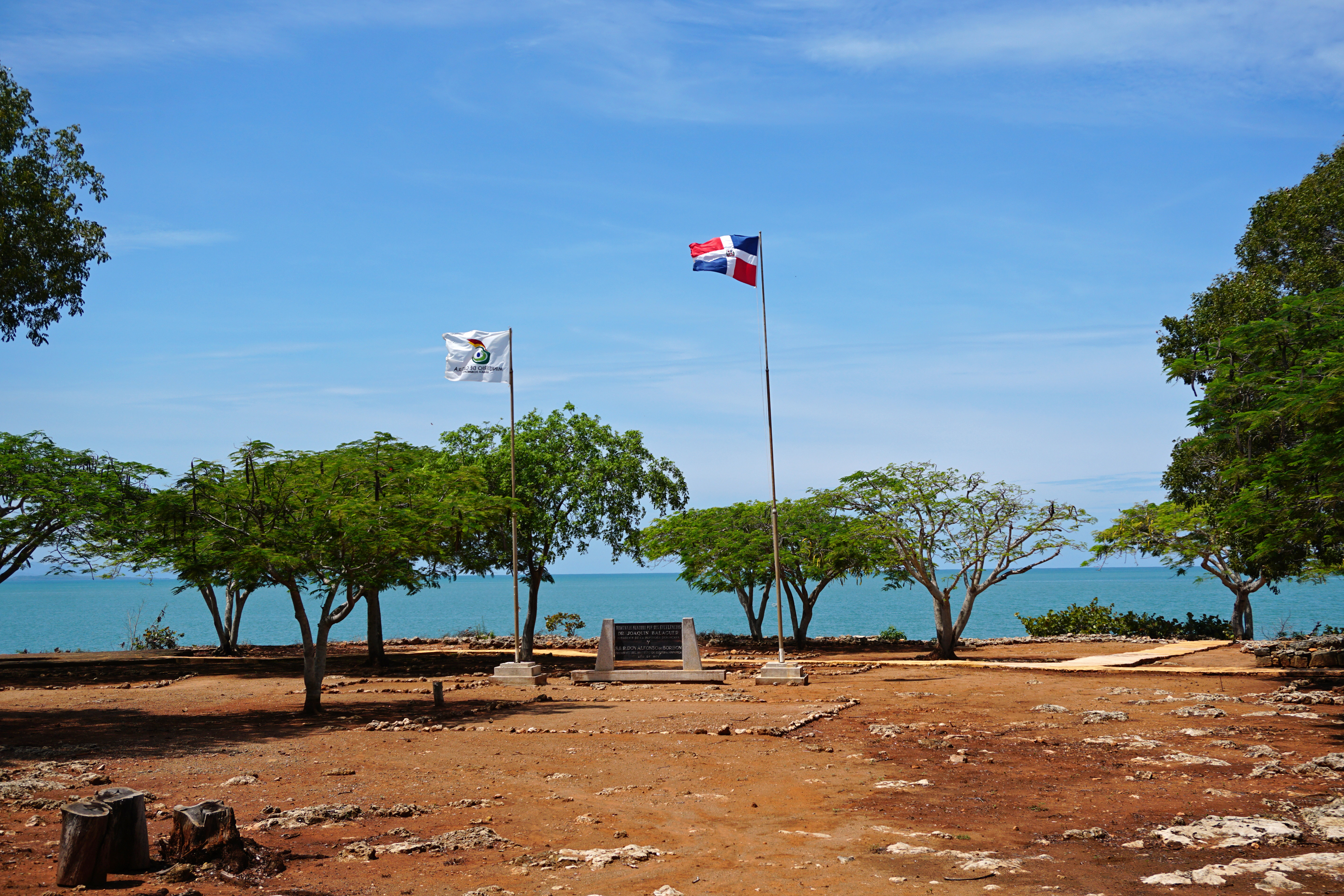
La Isabela Archaeological National Park conmemorative plaque and flags

La Isabela was established to search for precious metals. La Isabela was struck by the first known epidemic to spread from Europe to the New World in 1493 and two of the earliest North Atlantic hurricanes observed by Europeans in 1494 and 1495.

Hunger and disease led to mutiny, and a group of settlers, led by Bernal de Pisa, attempted to capture and make off with several ships and go back to Spain. La Isabela barely survived until 1496 when Columbus decided to abandon it in favor of a new settlement founded in 1498 called Nueva Isabela, and soon renamed Santo Domingo.

== History of the colony ==
After his first voyage to the New World, Columbus returned to Hispaniola with seventeen ships. Columbus' settlers built houses, storerooms, a Roman Catholic church, and a large house for Columbus. He brought more than a thousand men, including sailors, soldiers, carpenters, stonemasons, and other workers. Priests and nobles came as well. Although historical records mention neither women nor Africans, skeletal remains in graves found at least one European woman and indicated African origin for others, but whether the latter were sailors or slaves is as yet undetermined. The Spaniards brought pigs, horses, wheat, sugarcane, and guns. Rats and microbes came with them, leading to the first influenza epidemic in the Americas. The settlement took up more than two hectares.

The first Mass was celebrated on 6 January 1494. The town included 200 thatch huts, a plaza, and Columbus' stone house and arsenal.

The Taíno were local natives living in the mountains near La Isabela. They lived on fish and staples such as pineapple, which they introduced to the Spaniards. The food that they provided was important to the Spaniards. Columbus said that there were no finer people in the world.

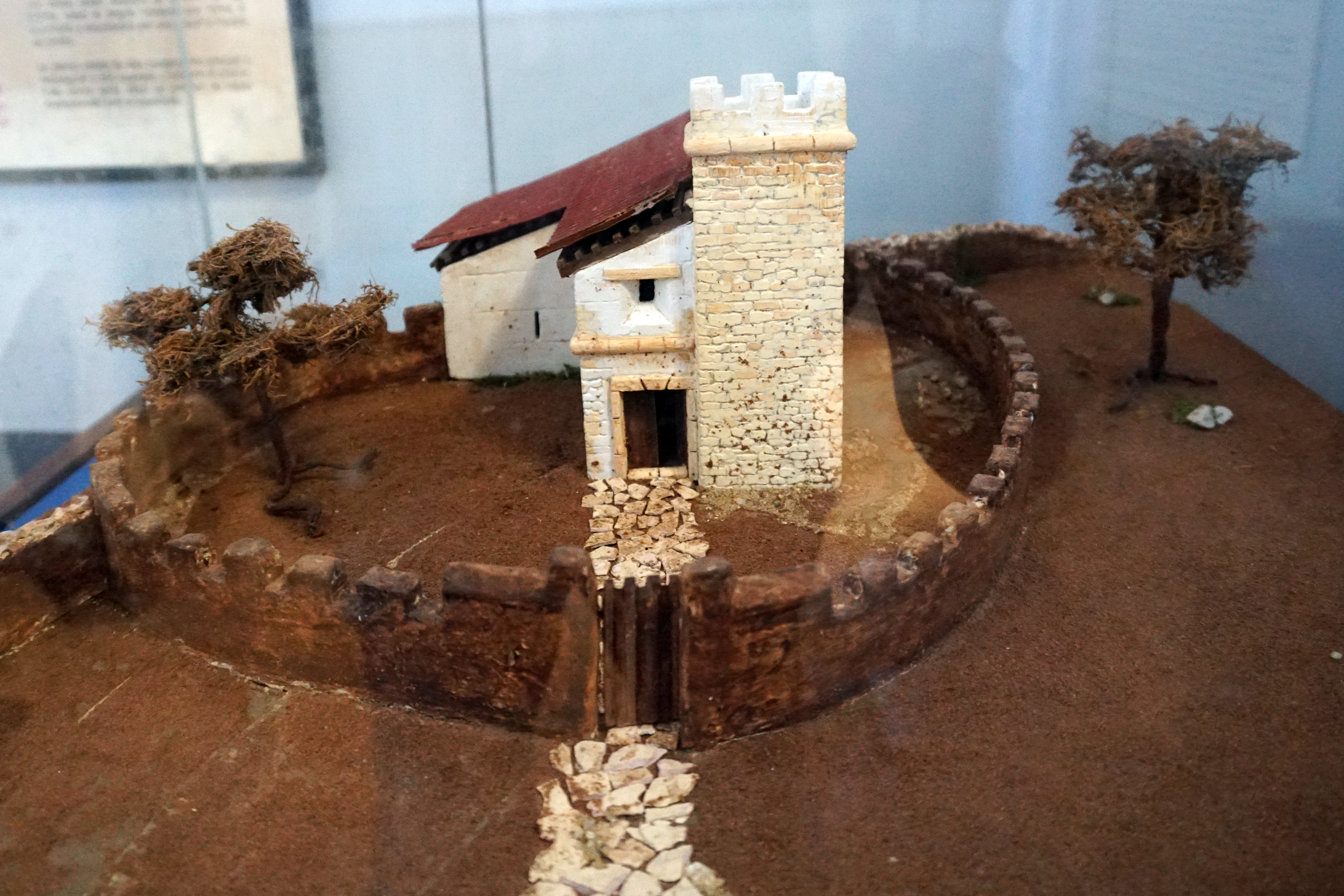
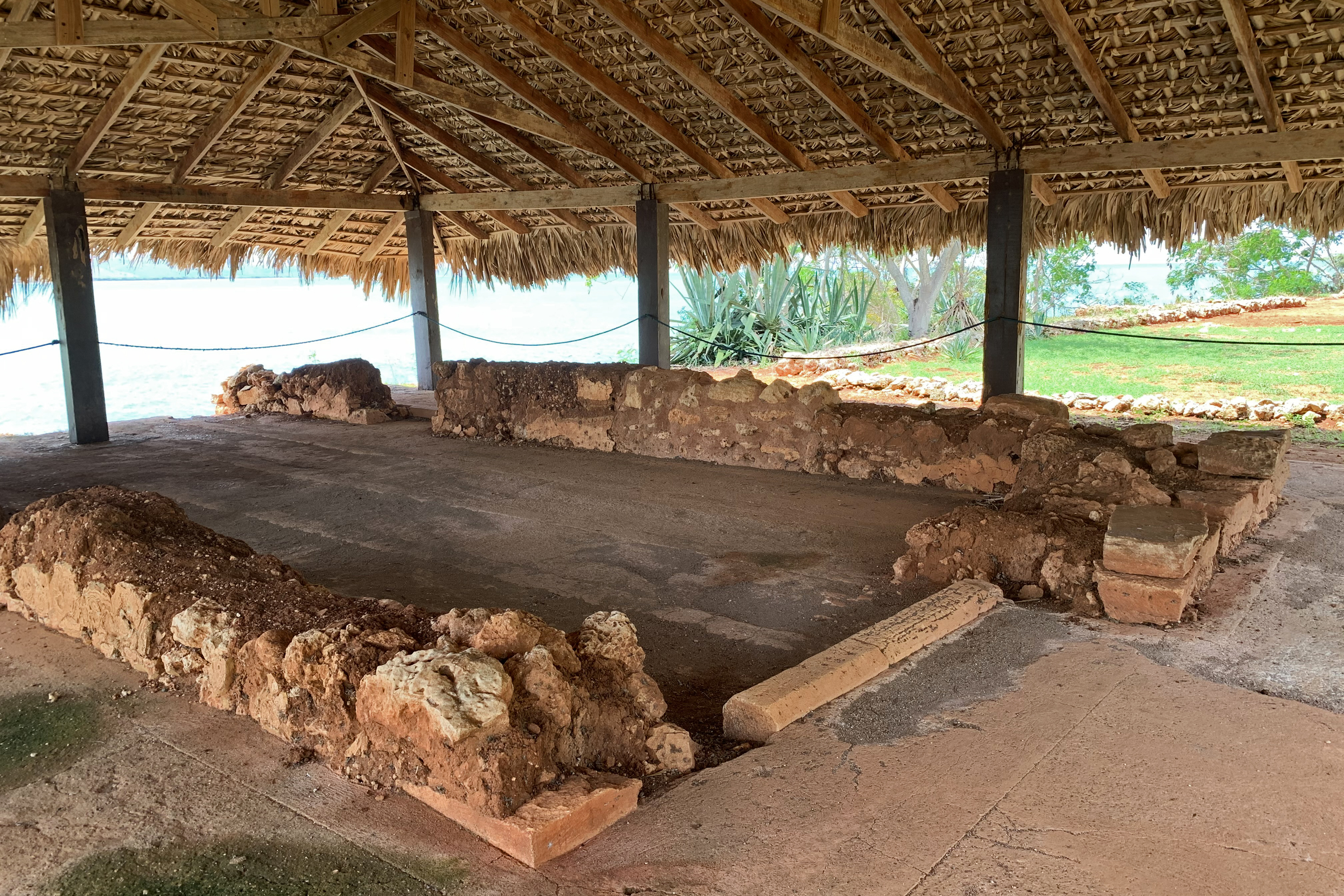
Scale model of Columbus House at La Isabela Museum (top) and Foundation remains of Columbus House in La Isabela (bottom)

In March 1494, Columbus's men began to search, with Taíno Indians, in the mountains of Hispaniola for gold and small amounts were found.

In June 1495, a large storm that the Taíno called a hurricane hit the island. The Taíno retreated to the mountains while the Spaniards remained in the colony. Several ships were sunk, including the flagship, the Marie-Galante. Cannon barrels and anchors from that era have been found in the bay. Gelatinous silt from rivers and wave action has raised the level of the bay floor and covers any parts of wrecks that may remain.

Caves on the island where the Indians may have sheltered depict pictures of the sun, plants, animals, strange shapes, people, bearded faces, and sailing ships.

In 1975, the Smithsonian concluded that the remains found in La Isabela of two male African skeletons dated back to 1250AD but is dismissed as Afrocentric pseudohistory.

== Aftermath ==
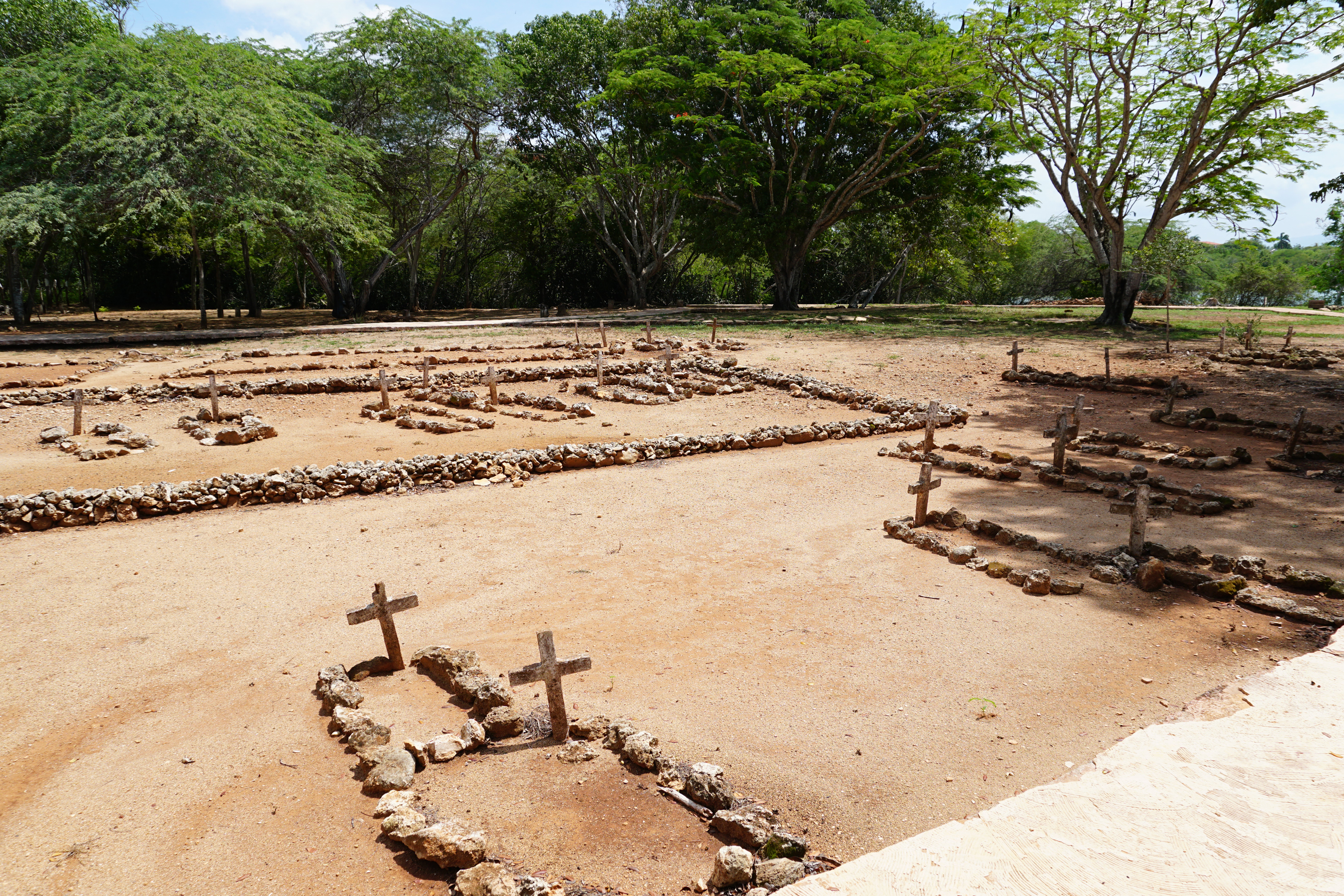
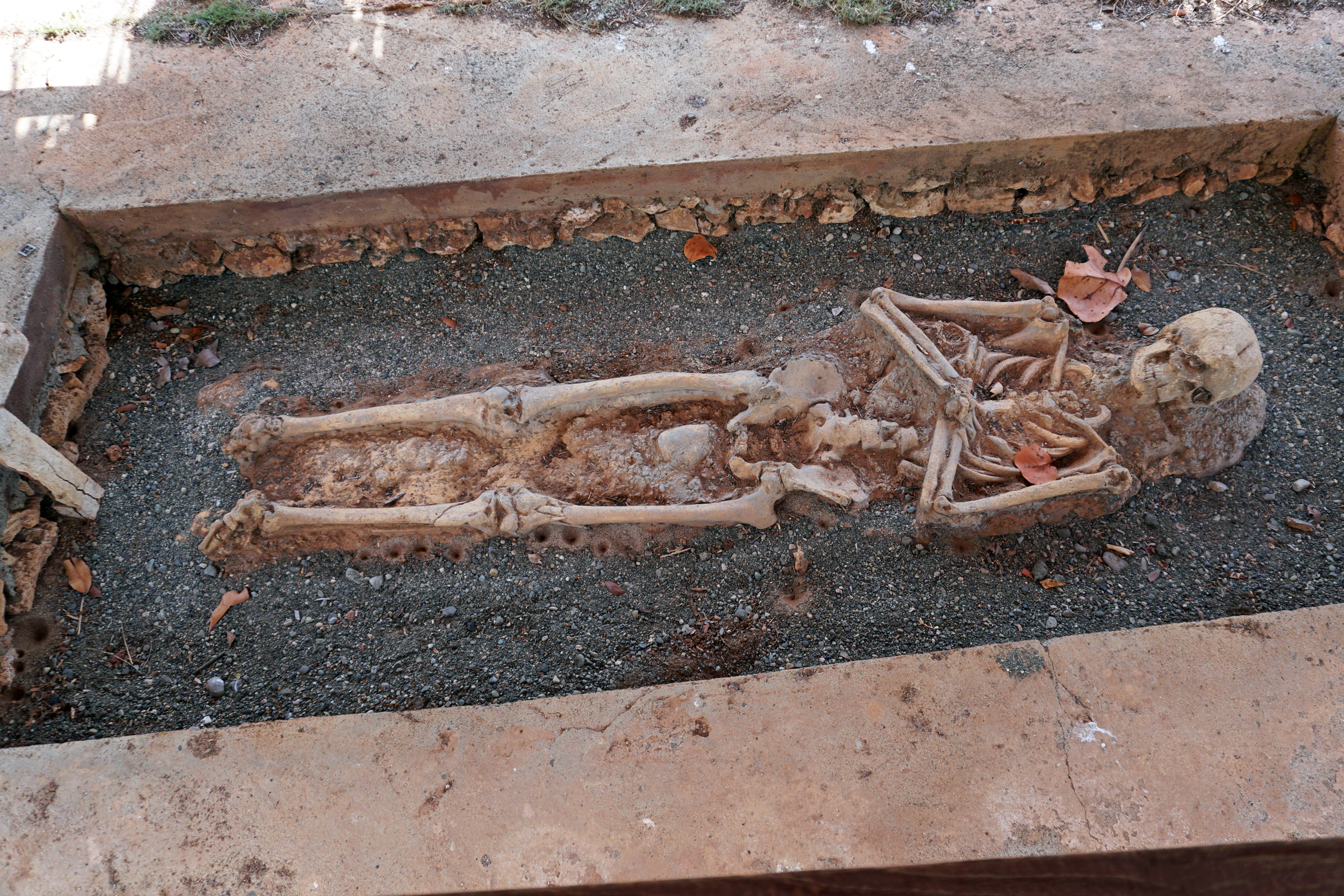
La Isabela cemetery (top) and skeleton of a Spaniard found in the cemetery (bottom)

Christopher Columbus was absent from Isabela from 24 April until 29 September 1494, on an exploratory trip to Cuba during which time he also discovered Jamaica. Christopher left his brother Diego Columbus as president of the island, with Fray Bernardo Buil and Pedro Fernandez Coronel as regents. During his absence, his brother Bartholomew Columbus arrived, the Tainos revolted, and Captain Pedro Margarit fled back to Spain. On 24 March 1495, Christopher Columbus, allied with Guacanagari, marched against the other caciques with 200 men, 20 horses and 20 hounds. He killed or captured many, including the principal cacique Caonabo. It was Caonabo who was responsible for the Navidad massacre. He was sent to Spain as a prisoner. By then, only 630 Christians remained, "most of them sick, with many children and women among them." Christopher Columbus himself departed for Spain on 10 March 1496 with 225 Christians and 30 Indians aboard the Santa Cruz and Nina. By then, the native Taínos suffering from a "shortage of food and such a variety of plagues" were reduced in numbers by two thirds.

Within a year of Christopher Columbus' departure, "with their provisions running short and suffering and sickness growing, they became discontented with their present lot and despaired of the future." The alcalde mayor, Francisco Roldán, formed a secret faction, and "disdaining to be ruled by a foreigner," plotted to kill Christopher's brothers Bartholomew and Diego. First plotting to capture the town and fortress of Concepcion in the province of Cibao, Roldan eventually moved his rebels to Xaragua, where the land was fertile and the women were the "best-looking and best-natured in the country." When Christopher entered Santo Domingo on 30 August 1498, he found many of the people he had left behind two and a half years ago were dead, some 160 were sick, while many more had joined Roldan's rebellion. The two-year rebellion finally ended on 3 August 1499, when Christopher agreed to "restore Roldan to his office of perpetual alcalde mayor," allow 15 to return home to Spain, made grants of houses and land for those who stayed, and then "publicly proclaim that all that had happened was caused by false testimony of a few evil men."

The discovery of gold in 1499 within the cordillera central, and the resultant mining boom, meant Isabela was depopulated by 1500.

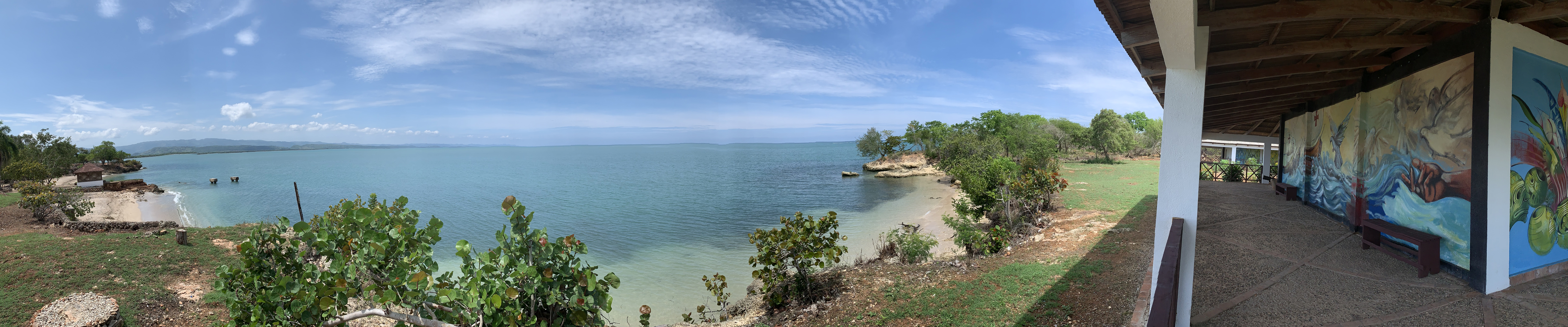
Panoramic view of La Isabela cove and the museum to the right
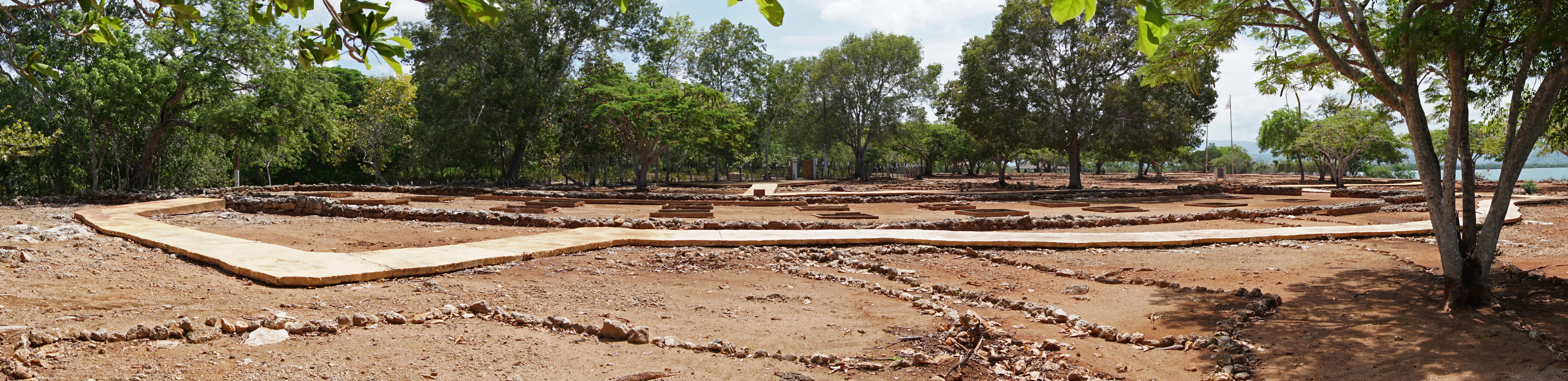
Panoramic view of La Isabela archaeological site

== See also ==
- Chiefdoms of Hispaniola
- List of cities in the Americas by year of foundation
