= Bernardo Buil =

Spanish diplomat and Catholic priest

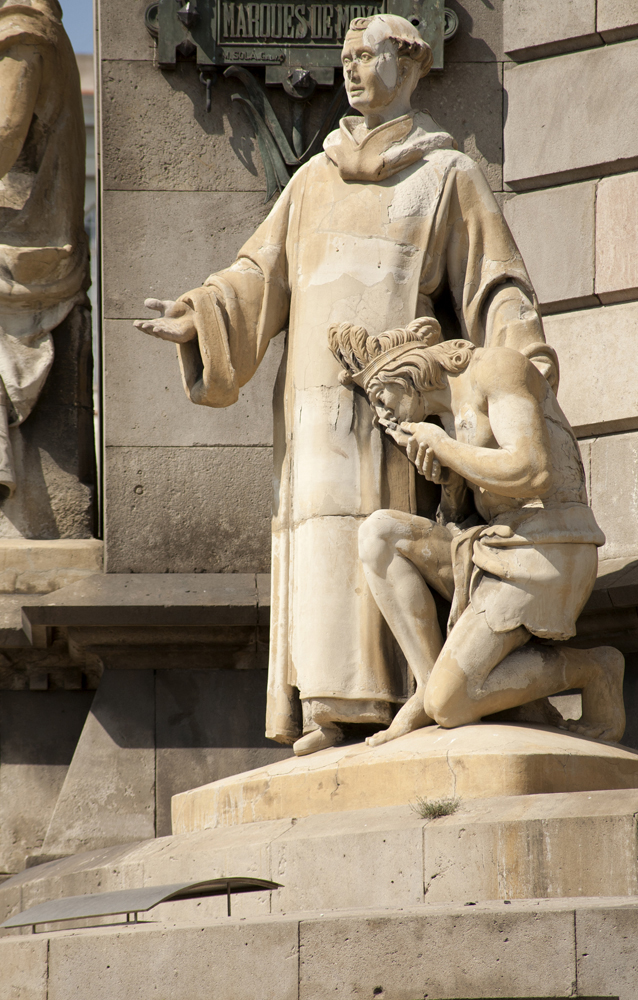
Bernat Boïl monument to Columbus, Barcelona

Bernat Boïl (also spelled Boil, Boyl or Boyal) was an Aragonese monk or friar, known as Fray Buil, who accompanied Christopher Columbus on his second voyage across the Atlantic. On January 6, 1494 Buil conducted the first mass held in the New World, in a temporary church on La Isabela. There is unclear evidence about his affiliation to a religious order. He left the Indies after disagreements with Columbus, and his mission work came to little.

== Identification ==
According to Stephen M. Donovan writing in the Catholic Encyclopedia, the accounts given of Buil are confused by a misidentification. He asserts that Bernardo Boil, a Franciscan, was a different person from a Bernardo Boyl, who was a Benedictine. It was to Boil, according to Donovan, that Pope Alexander VI addressed his Bull dated 25 June 1493, appointing him first vicar Apostolic of the New World, while other accounts recite that Boyl was the first person to hold the office. Ferdinand II had employed Boyl, the Benedictine, in diplomatic negotiations and had sought his appointment as vicar Apostolic in America. Citing researches of the historian Roselly, Donovan concludes that Ferdinand deliberately misidentified the intended recipient of the bull, and that Bernardo Boil, the Franciscan, did not leave Spain.

On the other hand, Livarus Oliger, also writing in the Catholic Encyclopedia, states that Buil was a Minim, citing research of Fita for the view that the bull of Alexander had a clerical error in the phrase ordinis Minorum which would indicate that Buil was a Franciscan.

== Voyage ==
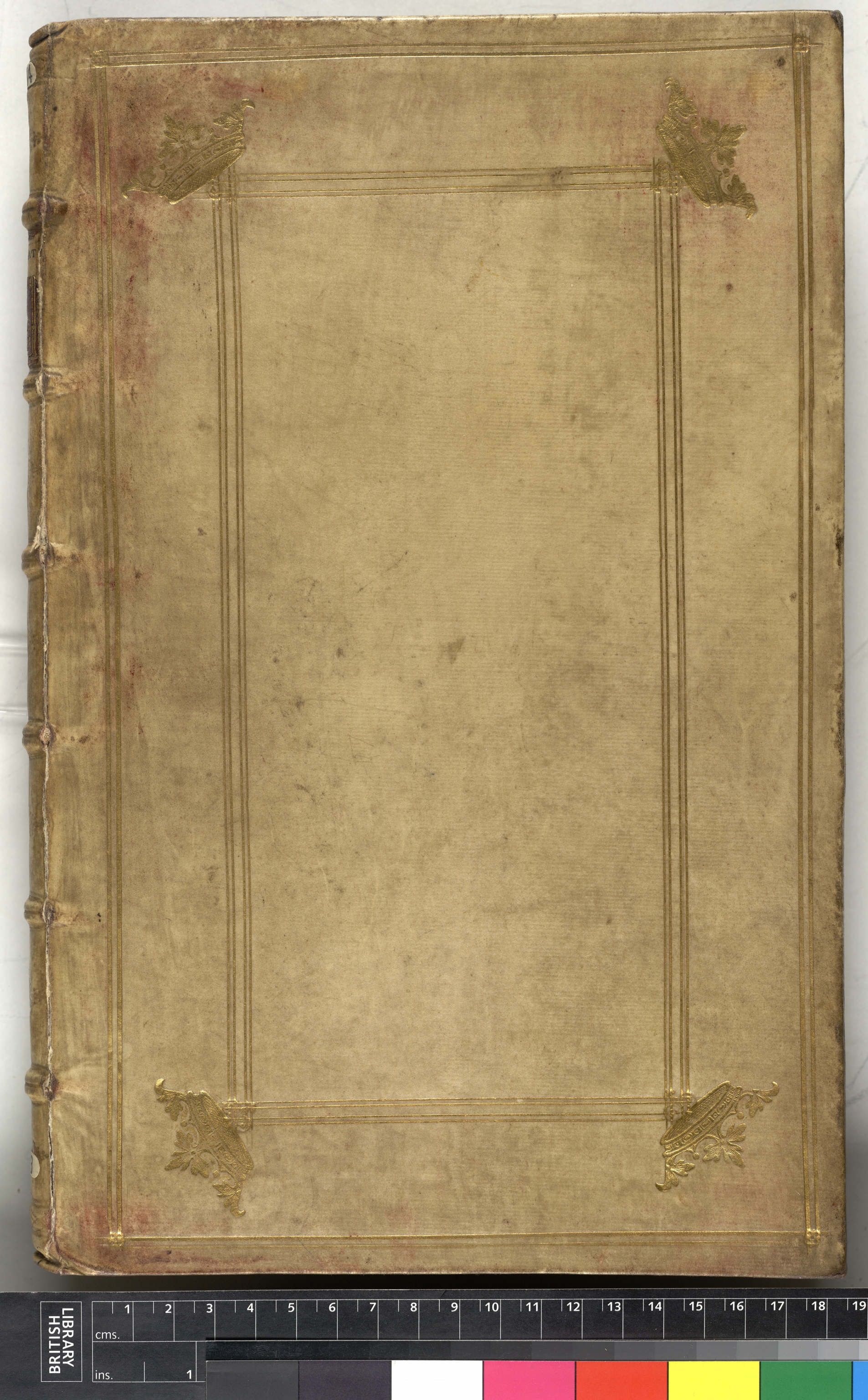
Nova typis transacta navigatio novi orbis Indiæ occidentalis, upper cover

The 1911 Encyclopædia Britannica states that twelve missionaries accompanied the second Columbus expedition of 1493, under the orders of Bernardo Buil, a Benedictine. On January 6, 1494 Buil conducted the first mass held in the New World, in a temporary church on La Isabela. James Reston, who calls him a Benedictine monk, says that Buil took a hard line against the Taíno leader Guacanagaríx, arguing for his execution. Later Buil returned from the Indies, and was one of those accusing Columbus of harshness and inconsistency. He resumed work as a diplomat.

An account of Buil and the Benedictine mission was later written by a Benedictine abbot, Caspar Plautius (Kaspar Plautz) of Seitenstetten Abbey in Austria. A fanciful work with fictional parts and fantastic illustrations, it was published as Nova typis transacta navigatio novi orbis Indiæ occidentalis at Linz in 1621. Plautius used the pseudonym Honorius Philoponus, dedicating the work to himself.
