= RFB =

RFB or RfB may refer to:

- Radio Free Brooklyn, a community freeform Internet radio station in Brooklyn, NY
- Redox Flow battery, a kind of battery that uses a liquid electrolyte that flows through tanks, unlike Dry Cells with solid electrolytes, such as typical Alkaline batteries or Lithium-ion batteries.
- Reichenbachfall Funicular, in the Swiss canton of Berne
- Regional fishery body
- RFB (protocol), a simple "remote framebuffer" protocol for remote access to graphical user interfaces
- Rhein-Flugzeugbau, a German aircraft company
- "Room, Food, and Beverage", see Comps (casino)
- Roter Frontkämpferbund ("Red Front Fighters' League"), a paramilitary organization of the Communist Party of Germany during the Weimar Republic
- Kel-Tec RFB, a gas-operated semi-automatic rifle
- República Federativa do Brasil
- Request For Bid, a business process to request pricing on a specific product from vendors. See Call For Bids
