= Radio Free Brooklyn =

Coordinates: 40.698913°N 73.925014°W

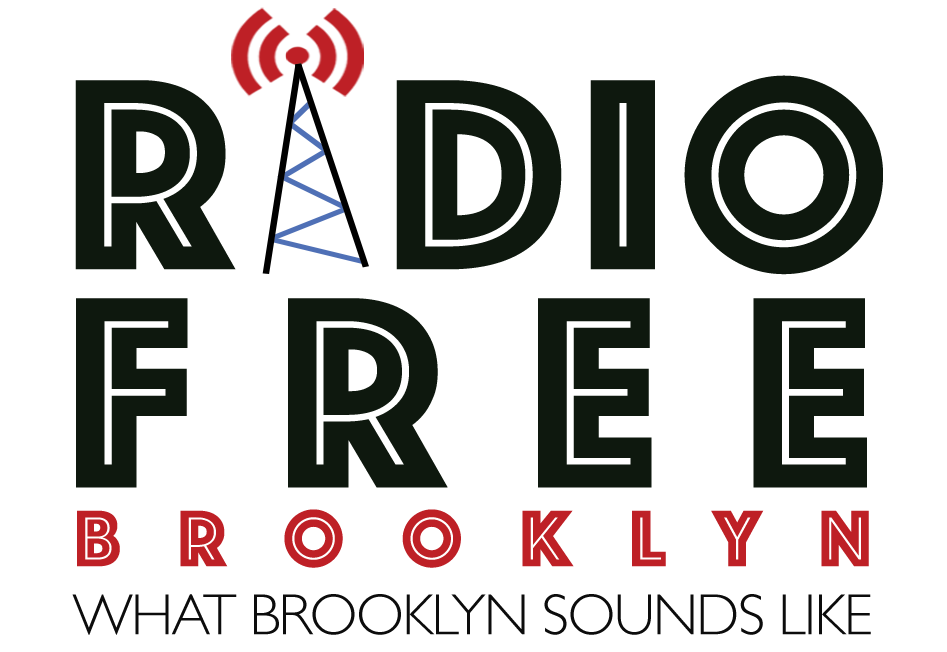
- Brooklyn, New York; United States

Programming
- Format: Free-form radio

Ownership
- Owner: Radio Free Brooklyn

History
- Founded: May 13, 2015

Links
- Webcast: Listen live
- Website: www.radiofreebrooklyn.org

Radio Free Brooklyn (RFB) is a 501(c)3 non-profit organization that operates a free-form internet radio station headquartered at 199 Cook Street in the Bushwick neighborhood of Brooklyn, New, York. The station currently offers 78 original radio programs produced by members of the organization, including 63 weekly live broadcasts originating from its Brooklyn studio. The station also airs two syndicated programs: Democracy Now! and The BradCast.

== Mission and philosophy ==
Radio Free Brooklyn's stated mission is to give a global voice to local artists, residents, community organizers and other non-profit institutions by providing a commercial-free freeform Internet Radio platform. All original programming is created by individual hosts, most of whom live and work in the greater NYC area, and has no restrictions or requirements imposed by the station. The resulting talk and music programming is an eclectic mix of talk and music with subjects such as local politics, LGBT issues, literature, and music.

Radio Free Brooklyn also has a stated commitment to what they call the "three pillars" of their philosophy: Community, Discovery and Education. Co-founder Tom Tenney summed up their philosophy by saying, "the focus is on providing our community members with an experience in media creation/curation that is enlightening, educational, critical, creative and hopefully, joyful."

== History ==
Radio Free Brooklyn was launched on May 13, 2015, by Tom Tenney and Robert Prichard, both veteran producers of the NYC underground performance scene. Since that date, the station has produced 132 original shows broadcasting 24/7/365. For its first 30 months, Radio Free Brooklyn introduced new programming every six months, in May and November. But in November 2017 the station abandoned these 6-month "seasons" and now accepts new shows throughout the year on a rolling basis. All new hosts must first volunteer with the station for 3 months before being offered a permanent show.

== Recognition ==
In February 2016, Radio Free Brooklyn was profiled by the London Telegraph, in which writer Pete Naughton described Radio Free Brooklyn as "a glowing petri dish of creativity, variety, and counter-cultural energy." The Mixcloud Online Radio Awards chose Radio Free Brooklyn as a finalist in the category, "Best Online Radio Station in North America" for both 2015 and 2016 On April 27, 2017, Time Out New York included Radio Free Brooklyn in their list of The Best Independent Online Radio Stations in NYC, and on July 28, 2017, Digital Trends listed the station as one of the 14 best Internet streaming radio stations.

== Notable guests ==
Some notable guests that have appeared on Radio Free Brooklyn programs include: Chuck Schumer, Robert Downey, Sr., Spencer Tunick, Kosmo Vinyl, Mike Doughty, Michelle Shocked, Anthony Haden-Guest, Christian Finnegan, Frank Conniff, John S. Hall, The Gregory Brothers, Sofia Rei, Annie Finch, Les Bohem, Myq Kaplan, Charles Busch, Kalmia Travers of Rubblebucket, You Bred Raptors?, Soul Inscribed, Irka Mateo, Lane Moore, Cinema Cinema, Battles, Computer Magic, Savoir Adore, Cassie and Maggie MacDonald, Kevin Allison, Ken Johnson, Diet Cig, Ben Curtis, Josh Ruben, Ben Newman (of DIIV), The East River String Band, Veronica Varlow, Reverend Jen, John Jastremski, Davi Santos, Jessie Woo, and Billy Magnussen.
