= Jaragua (Hispaniola) =

Taino tribe in Hispaniola

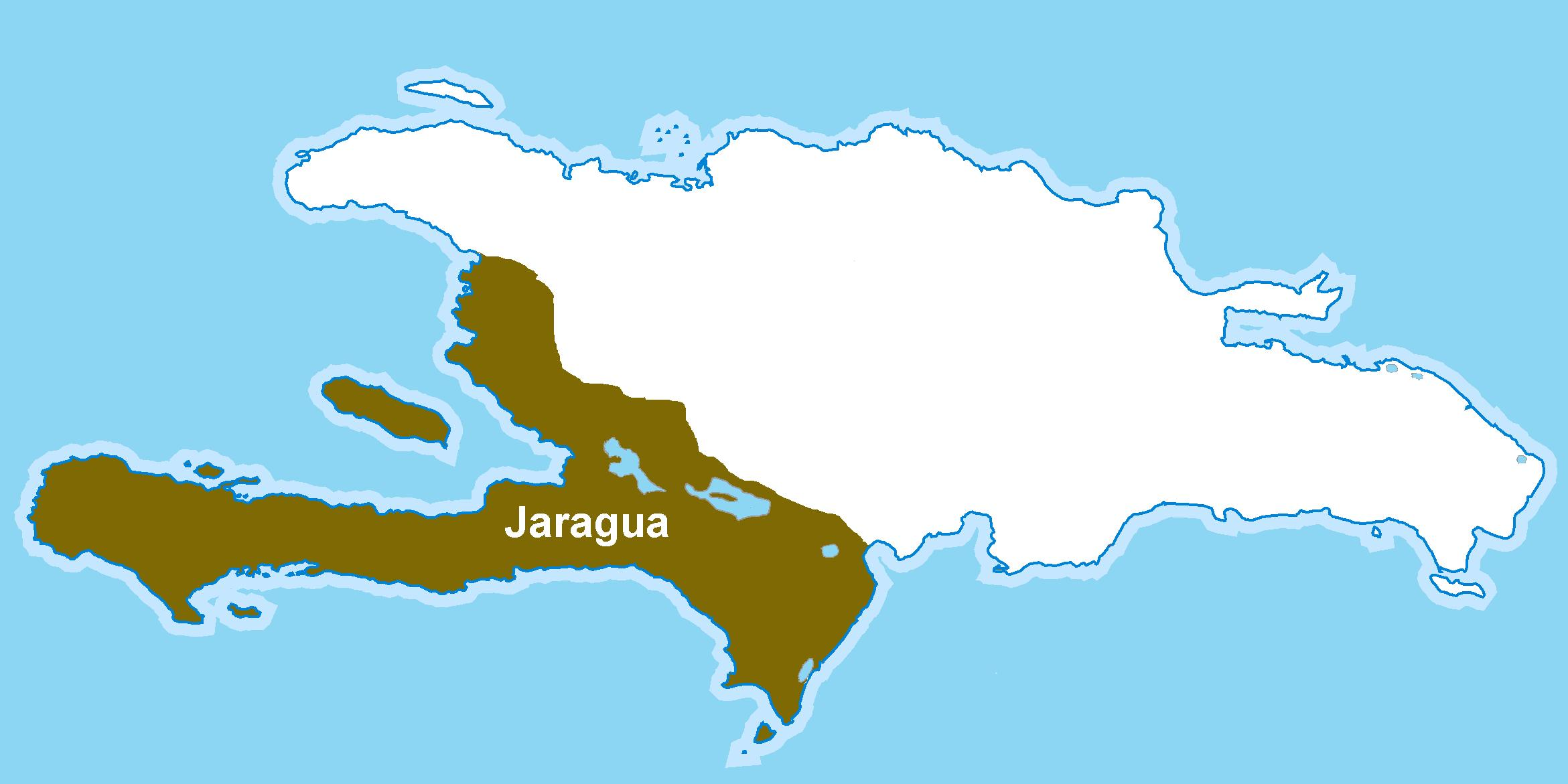
Location of Jaragua on the island of Hispaniola

The cacicazgo of Jaragua, also written as Xaraguá, was one of the five chiefdoms in the island of Hispaniola, stretching across the southwest; delimited to the north by the cacicazgo of Marién, to the south by the Caribbean Sea, to the east by the cacicazgo of Maguana, and to the west by the Jamaica Channel. Jaragua emerged as the union of two previous cacicazgos, Zui and Yáquimo.

Jaragua was ruled by the cacique Bohechío. It had the largest area of the chiefdoms on the island. He had his seat at a place called Guava, near the present-day city of Léogâne, Haiti; it was divided into 26 nitaínos.

The situation among the Native people was that Bohechío, the brother of Anacaona, had to reside within the subchiefdom of Yáquimo, which was waging a war against two earlier, more culturally primitive Native settlers of Quisqueya, one of them located in the region of Yuboa and the other in the extreme southwest of the island called Guacayarima.

Bohechío required a double alliance with the chief of Haniguayagua for control of the southwest and Caonabo, and for control of and access to Yuboa.
