= La Navidad =

Fort on the northeast coast of Haiti

- Location within Haiti
- Coordinates: 19°41′26″N 72°00′57″W

La Navidad ("The Nativity", i.e. Christmas) was a Spanish fort that Christopher Columbus and his crew built on the northwest coast of Hispaniola (near present day Caracol, Nord-Est Department, Haiti) in 1492 from the remains of the Spanish ship the Santa María during his first voyage. La Navidad was the first European settlement established in the New World during the Age of Discovery, although it was destroyed by Indigenous people by the following year.

== Founding ==
Columbus sailed around the island of Hispaniola on Christmas Eve of 1492, during his first voyage. One of his ships, the Santa María, drifted onto a bank of the Acul Bay and heeled over. After hearing from Guacanagari that there was much gold to be had on the island, Columbus decided that he would leave the crew of his wrecked vessel to make a settlement on the island and gather the promised gold. He ordered the ship dismantled to provide the building materials for a small fortress:

"I have ordered a tower and fortress to be constructed and, a large cellar, not because I believe there is any necessity on account of [the natives]," he noted in his journal. "I am certain the people I have with me could subjugate all this island... as the population are naked and without arms and very cowardly."

Columbus called the port Puerto de la Navidad ("Christmas Port"), the day he landed there. He appointed Diego de Arana, chief constable of the fleet and son of Rodrigo, Pedro Gutiérrez, butler of the Spanish royal dais, and Rodrigo de Escobedo to govern the fortress of 36 men. They included carpenters, calkers, a physician, a tailor, and a gunner. Additionally, the settlement was supplied with provisions, trading goods, arms and artillery.

On Friday, 4 January 1493, Columbus set sail in the Niña in search of the third ship in the fleet, the Pinta. The Pinta was commanded by Martín Alonzo Pinzón, and had been absent for six weeks. On the night of 21 November, the caravel Pinta had vanished into the darkness off the coast of Cuba, and in his journal Columbus accused Pinzón of deliberately having separated the Pinta from the other ships in order to beat the admiral to the rich sources of gold which Columbus imagined were in the immediate area. Even more disquieting was his fear that Pinzón might break for Spain in the fast-sailing Pinta to be the first to bring news of the discovery to the Catholic Monarchs and to "tell them lies" about the admiral's conduct of the expedition. On Sunday morning, 6 January 1493, the missing Pinta was spotted approaching from the east, and after a heated argument between the two men, the fleet returned to gather people and supplies for a return voyage.

== Destruction ==
When Columbus returned to Navidad on 27 Nov 1493, his second voyage from Spain, he "found it burned to the ground ... nobody in the vicinity." In the fields nearby, however, he discovered the "bodies of eight Christians." Columbus later discovered that, soon after his departure, his "men began to quarrel among themselves, each taking as many women and as much gold as he could." Gutiérrez and Escobedo left with nine others, along with their women, for the gold mines. However, the "lord of the mines" turned, killed them and then marched back to Navidad, defended by Arana with ten others, and Guacanagari. Caonabo set fire to houses, forcing Columbus' men into the sea, where eight drowned, and three were killed onshore.

Columbus decided to build a settlement farther east in present-day Dominican Republic and named it La Isabela after Queen Isabella I.

== Attempt at rediscovery ==
After Columbus sailed away a second time, the site apparently was forgotten until a Haitian farmer led William Hodges to a location in 1977. Hodges, an amateur archaeologist and American medical missionary, received permission from the Haitian government to excavate a tennis-court-size section of the marshland, and he and his helpers found some artifacts of La Navidad. Despite the finds, no conclusive evidence has been discovered yet to pinpoint the exact location of La Navidad.

== See also ==
- Chiefdoms of Hispaniola
