= Maria Cristina Fumagalli =

British-based literary scholar

- Born: 14 April 1964 (age 62); Milan, Italy

Academic background
- Education: Università Statale di Milano; University of Sheffield

Academic work
- Discipline: Literary scholar
- Sub-discipline: Caribbean literature; Culture of the Caribbean; diaspora studies; visual culture
- Institutions: University of Essex

Maria Cristina Fumagalli, FBA (born 14 April 1964) is a British-based literary scholar whose work focuses on the literatures, cultures, and visual arts of the Caribbean and its diasporas. Her research adopts an interdisciplinary and comparative approach, with an emphasis on visual culture and transnational perspectives. She is a professor in the Department of Literature, Film, and Theatre Studies at the University of Essex.

== Early life and education ==
Fumagalli was born on 14 April 1964 in Milan, Italy. She obtained her undergraduate degree from the Università Statale di Milano, graduating in 1990. She undertook a Doctor of Philosophy (PhD) degree in the Department of English Literature of the University of Sheffield, which she completed in 1997 with a thesis titled "'L'Alto Volo' and the return to the real: the poetical journey of Dante, Seamus Heaney and Derek Walcott."

== Academic career ==
Fumagalli joined the University of Essex in 1999, as a teaching fellow in Postcolonial Studies. She was appointed a lecturer in literature in 2002, and promoted to senior lecturer in 2006. She was appointed Professor of Literature in 2011. She retired in 2025, and was made professor emeritus.

She has received research funding from organizations including the Arts and Humanities Research Council (AHRC) and the Leverhulme Trust. In 2006, she was one of the principal investigators for the AHRC-funded project American Tropics: Towards A Literary Geography. In 2012, she was awarded a Leverhulme Research Fellowship to complete her monograph On the Edge: Writing the Border between Haiti and the Dominican Republic (2015; 2018 paperback).

Her monograph Derek Walcott's Painters: A Life with Pictures (2023; 2025 paperback) was supported by a Major Research Fellowship from the Leverhulme Trust (2016–2019). Her most recent research, Painting the Caribbean 1850–1904, supported by a Leverhulme Research Fellowship (2023–24), explores the artistic and cultural exchanges between European, American, and Caribbean painters during a period of significant socio-political change.

=== Other work ===
Fumagalli's monograph On the Edge: Writing the Border between Haiti and the Dominican Republic has been associated with a series of cultural activities in Martinique, Guadeloupe, Cuba, the Dominican Republic, and Haiti. Her research on the Haiti-Dominican Republic border informed the 2021 Research Excellence Framework (REF) impact case study titled Reconceptualizing Troubled Border Relations: Promoting Cross-Border Collaboration, Cooperation and Solidarity between Haiti and the Dominican Republic in the Wake of the Denationalization Crisis in Hispaniola. The same project received the Best International Research Impact Award from the University of Essex in 2019.

As an investigadora asociada (associate investigator) of OBMICA, a Santo Domingo-based organization focused on migration, human rights, and social development, Fumagalli co-organized events such as a 2017 commemoration in Comendador, Elias Piña (Dominican Republic), marking the 80th anniversary of the 1937 massacre of Haitians and Haitian-Dominicans. Her work has also highlighted the socio-political effects of the Dominican Constitutional Court's 2013 ruling, which resulted in the denationalization of thousands of Dominicans of Haitian descent.

In addition to her academic and advocacy work, Fumagalli co-produced several plays by Derek Walcott at the Lakeside Theatre, including the UK premiere of Moon-Child (2011), Pantomime (2012), and the world premiere of O Starry Starry Night (2013), directed or co-directed by Walcott.

== Honors ==
- Elected Fellow of the British Academy in 2024
- Elected Fellow of the English Association in 2025

== Books ==
- Derek Walcott's Painters: A Life with Pictures (2023; 2025 paperback)
- On the Edge: Writing the Border between Haiti and the Dominican Republic (2015; 2018 paperback)
- Caribbean Perspectives on Modernity: Returning Medusa's Gaze (2009)
- The Flight of the Vernacular: Seamus Heaney, Derek Walcott and the Impress of Dante (2001)

She has also co-edited several collections, including:

- The Cross-Dressed Caribbean: Writing, Politics, Sexualities (2013)
- Surveying the American Tropics: A Literary Geography from New York to Rio (2013)

She is the author of the Introduction to Freddy Prestol Castillo El Masacre se pasa a pie / You can cross the Masacre on foot (2019)
