= Francisco Roldán =

Spanish colonial administrator

Francisco Roldán (circa 1450 - 11 July [O.S. 1 July] 1502) was a Spanish colonial administrator.

== Biography ==
He was left as alcalde mayor (local governor) of La Isabela when Christopher Columbus returned to Spain from his second voyage. In 1497, Roldán revolted against Bartholomew Columbus and established a rival regime in western Hispaniola, drawing into it by 1498 about half of the Spaniards. When Christopher Columbus returned to Hispaniola in August 1498, he was able to make peace with the rebels by granting concessions, including control of native labor.

Under Francisco de Bobadilla, the governor who replaced Christopher Columbus, Roldán received a pardon for his sedition.

Roldán died on 11 July [O.S. 1 July] 1502 during a hurricane that wrecked 20 vessels of the 31-ship convoy, including the flagship, El Dorado, in the Mona Passage returning to Spain. Among the surviving ships was the Aguja, the weakest ship of the convoy and which carried the gold Columbus was owed—spurring accusations that Columbus magically invoked the storm out of vengeance.
