= Irka Mateo =

Irka Mateo
- Origin: Dominican Republic
- Genres: World music
- Instruments: Vocals, percussion

Irka Mateo is a Taino Dominican singer-songwriter and world music artist.

== Career ==
Her artistic sensibility incubated in Spain, France, Brazil, Canada, the United States and her native Dominican Republic. In the late 1970s and early 1980s she lived in Europe (Spain and France) where she immersed herself in the emerging world music scene. In the late 1980s she moved to Canada, where she worked with the best artists in that country performing regularly at the Montreal Jazz Festival and other events and venues. It was also in Montreal that she recorded the Spanish-language version of Sucre Amer, a song in defense of Haitian sugar cane workers – the recording that led to her opening for The Fugees when they played in Haiti in 1996.

In 1998 she returned to Quisqueya (Hispaniola). Along with performing in the country and the wider Caribbean she spent the next 10 years immersing herself in the islands its folk music; founded on popular religious celebrations and Taino culture. The result is music much more infused with Afro and Taíno traditions. This work also lead Mateo to co-founding Guabancex, Wind and Water Society dedicated to the popularization and preservation of native culture. In her performances she dons a native headdress during the singing of "Anacaona" — a song that is essentially a passion play of the Taino queen hanged by the Spanish Conquistadors.

During this period she also collaborated with Luis Días (composer) on his recording EL TERROR EN VIVO (with Transporte Urbano)

Along with this field work in the Dominican Republic, Mateo has toured performing in concerts and festivals in the Caribbean and Latin America; including a performance in front of 100,000 people in Mexico City.

In 2008, Grammy Award-winning producer, Daniel Blumenfield, of GoodandEvil, Inc. discovered Mateo music and brought her to New York. She followed up with the release of the album Anacaona in 2009.

On November 16, 2017, Mateo & La Tirindanga released Vamo a Gozá, an album with 9 tracks. The album is described as "expanding the boundaries of Dominican music, while building bridges to Latin America, the Caribbean, Africa and the United States."

== See also ==
- Culture of the Dominican Republic
- Tainos
