= Caonabo =

Taino ruler at the time of Columbus

Cacique of Maguana
- Reign: ?–1496
- Born: Lucayan Archipelago
- Died: 1496
- Spouse: Anacaona

Caonabo (died 1496) was a cacique (chieftain) of Hispaniola at the time of Christopher Columbus's arrival to the island. He was known for his fighting skills and his ferocity. Caonabo was married to Anacaona, who was the sister of another cacique named Bohechío. He was born to the Lucayan people and later migrated to the island.

In retaliation against mistreatment of the Indigenous peoples of Hispaniola, Caonabo led attacks against the Spanish, including an assault on La Navidad which left 39 Spaniards dead. His capture in 1494 led to the first native American uprising against the Spanish rule. Caonabo died in Spanish captivity.

== Chieftain of Maguana ==
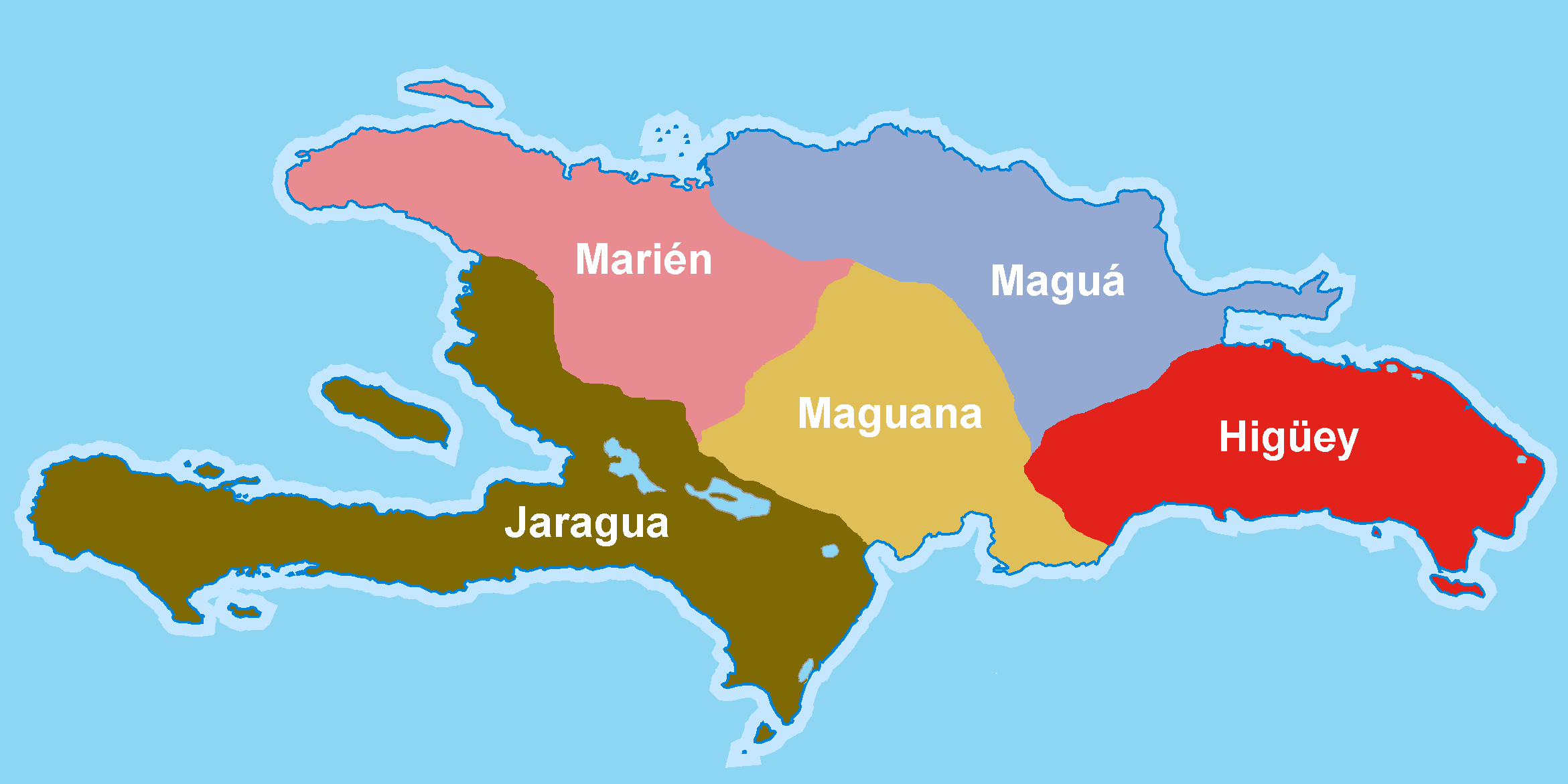
The five cacicazgos (chiefdoms) of Hispaniola at the time of Christopher Columbus's arrival.

Caonabo was one of the principal caciques on Hispaniola at the time of Christopher Columbus's arrival. The island was divided into five cacicazgos (chiefdoms). Caonabo most likely lived in what is now San Juan de la Maguana, Dominican Republic. He ruled over the chiefdom of Maguana in the southern part of the island. His wife, Anacaona, was the sister of another powerful cacique—Bohechío, of the neighboring Jaragua (what is now Southern Haiti) Caonabo was not native to Hispaniola, rather he was born on the Lucayan Archipelago of the Bahamas.

The historian Bartolomé de las Casas, one of the first Spanish settlers in the Americas, wrote of Caonabo:

...éste fue valerosísimo y esforzado señor, y de mucha gravedad y autoridad, y según entendimos los que á los principios á esta Isla vinimos, era de nacional Lacayo, natural de las islas de los Lucayos, que se pasó dellas acá, y por ser varón en las guerras y en la paz señalado, llegó á ser rey de aquella provincia, y por todos muy estimado.

— Casas: Historia de las Indias
Translation:

...he was an incredibly brave and esforzado [backed by the force of law] man, with much gravitas and authority, and as those of us who were the first to arrive on this island understood, he was of the Lucayan people, born on the Lucayan Islands, who left to come here, and because he was singled out as a man of war and of peace, he came to be king of that province, and he was highly esteemed by all.

== Conflict with Spanish explorers ==
In 1492, Columbus attempted to land on the north coast of the island, but was forced to flee after being attacked by arrows. He eventually landed on the south coast near where the city of Santo Domingo was later founded. The Santa María shipwrecked on the north coast, and under Columbus's direction, the ship was salvaged in order to build a fort. Because the shipwreck occurred on Christmas Day, the fort was known as La Navidad.

Columbus left some of his crew at La Navidad and returned to Spain, mistakenly thinking that his men would not threaten the natives, whom he believed to be friendly. Caonabo led an attack on the fort in 1493, defeating all the Spaniards who remained. His wife Anacaona would later explain that, incensed at the treatment of the natives by the Spanish, she had motivated Caonabo to reclaim the village.

When Columbus returned to Hispaniola and found La Navidad destroyed, Caonabo quickly came to be considered one of the strongest leaders on the island. The cacique Guacanagaríx of Marién informed the Spaniards that Caonabo was responsible for the attack. In 1494, Bartholomew Columbus received word that Caonabo was planning an attack on the Spanish fort at Santo Tomás. In response, Columbus sent a party of four hundred men led by Alonso de Ojeda to march into the interior of the island in order to instill fear and subjugate the natives.

== Capture and death ==
Caonabo was captured by Ojeda and taken prisoner soon afterward. There are differing accounts of his capture. According to historian Samuel M. Wilson, the story was likely embellished and romanticized by the Spanish. Bartolomé de las Casas wrote that Ojeda had deceived Caonabo with a pre-arranged trick. In Casas's account, Ojeda brought highly polished handcuffs and chains which he presented as a gift to Caonabo. Ojeda supposedly convinced Caonabo that the objects had magical properties, and that they were worn by kings in Spain. When Caonabo tried on the handcuffs, Ojeda locked them and took him prisoner.

The capture of Caonabo roused the Taíno, leading to the first ever Native American uprising against the Spanish. Caonabo's brother, Manicatex, gathered around 7,000 Natives to attack the Spanish and rescue Caonabo. However, the Taíno were easily defeated, largely due to the Spaniards' use of cavalry. Manicatex and other Native leaders were taken prisoner. The Spanish decided to remove Caonabo from the island in order to prevent future uprisings, so he and his brother were sent to Spain. Caonabo died during the voyage and was buried at sea.
