= Cacicazgo =

Land ruled by a cacique

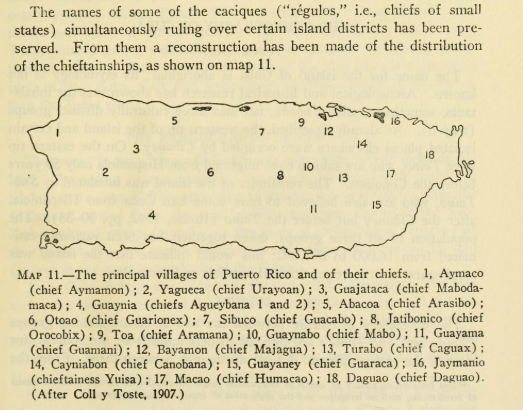
A map by Smithsonian of historical cacicazgos in Puerto Rico

A cacicazgo (Spanish; also anglicized as caciquedom) is an Indigenous Caribbean chiefdom, ruled by a cacique. The Spanish colonial system recognized Indigenous elites as nobles in Mexico and Peru, and other areas. Nobles could entail their estates, which were called cacicazgos on the model of Spanish entailed estates, or mayorazgos. This term is found in contexts such as "la princesa de Cofachiqui, señora de un cacigazgo indígena" or, for example: "In November of 1493, the island of Boriquén had approximately 20 cacigazgos." According to Spanish chronicles, the cacique was at the apex of Indigenous feudal structures in the Caribbean. Bartolomé de las Casas refers to these cacigazgos as kingdoms.

Many individual cacicazgos have been studied in colonial Mexico, showing that entailment was a successful means to preserve noble Indigenous resources as the situation for commoners declined. There are cases where Spaniards married into cacique families, thereby giving them access to Indigenous resources. In the Archivo General de la Nación, Mexico, a whole section of records, called Vínculos, is devoted to individual noble entailments. A collection of them was published in 1961. Cacicazgos survived into the nineteenth century. Conflicts over inheritance were common, and the litigants' arguments found in these cases form the basis for understanding some of the dynamics of the institution. Over time, the concept of cacique shifted, with some women attaining the title of cacica. Cacicazgo likewise underwent some transformation during the colonial era in Mexico. "By law, a cacique was a single heir and possessor of a cacicazgo estate, which always included land and often a subject labor force to work it. The Indians themselves, however, saw things differently, and by late colonial times it was not unusual for all the sons and daughters of a cacique (or cacica) to adopt the title. How and why this change took place, its chronology, and what it meant for local community organization remain imperfectly understood...The late colonial setting was vastly different, and indigenous noble claims of the period must be understood in the context in which they arose."

== See also ==
- Chiefdom – Form of hierarchical political organization in non-industrial societies
- Monarchy – Form of government ruled by a monarch, or a polity with this form of government
