= Guacanagaríx =

Taíno cacique of Hispaniola

- Depiction of Guacanagarix

Cacique of Marién
- Reign: c. 1492
- Born: 15th century Hispaniola
- Died: 1494

Guacanagaríx (alternate transcriptions: Guacanacaríc, Guacanagarí) was one of five Indigenous caciques (Taíno chiefs) of Hispaniola during the arrival of the Europeans in 1492, contemporaneous with the first of the voyages of Christopher Columbus.

He was the chief of the cacicazgo of Marién, which occupied the northwest of the island, roughly located in present-day Haiti.

Guacanagaríx received Christopher Columbus after the Santa María was wrecked during Columbus's first voyage to the New World. He allowed Columbus to establish the settlement of La Navidad near his village. The colonists that remained there were killed by a rival tribe before Columbus returned on his second voyage.

Guacanagaríx refused to ally himself with other caciques, who were trying to expel the Spaniards from the Captaincy General of Santo Domingo, and many times served as an informant and spy for the European settlers.

== Guacanagaríx complex ==
In the Dominican Republic, the term Guacanagaríx complex (Spanish: complejo de Guacanagaríx) has been used to describe a Dominican who is considered more interested in foreign culture than in his own country.

== See also ==
- Taíno peoples
- Spanish–Taíno War of San Juan–Borikén
- Colony of Santo Domingo topics
- Spanish West Indies
- Chiefdoms of Hispaniola
- Mir Jafar
- Benedict Arnold
- La Malinche
