= People of the Dominican Republic =

People who are associated with the Dominican Republic

Dominicans Dominicanos
- Flag of the Dominican Republic

Total population
- c. 14.5 million Diaspora c. 2.5 million

Regions with significant populations
- Dominican Republic: 11,427,557 (2024)
- United States: 2,539,896 (2024)
- Spain: 190,190 (2021)
- Puerto Rico: 56,186 (2024)
- Italy: 48,000
- Canada: 23,130
- Chile: 22,836 (2023)
- French Guiana (Overseas France): 20,000-25,000 (2023)
- Venezuela: 14,743 (2015)
- Switzerland: 11,154
- Germany: 11,091 (2015)
- Netherlands: 8,688 (2015)
- Panama: 8,095 (2015)
- Curaçao: 7,000
- Brazil: 5,605(2025)
- U.S. Virgin Islands: 5,442
- Aruba: 5,000
- Sint Maarten: 4,000
- France: 3,843 (2019)
- Belgium: 3,000
- Mexico: 2,849 (2020)
- Austria: 2,942
- Turks and Caicos Islands: 2,000
- British Virgin Islands: 2,000
- Antigua and Barbuda: 2,000
- Haiti: 2,000

Languages
- Dominican Spanish; Frespañol (along the border)

Religion
- Predominantly Roman Catholic; Protestant

Related ethnic groups
- Spaniards, other Caribbean people

Dominicans (Spanish: Dominicanos [dominiˈkanos]), also known as Quisqueyans (Spanish: Quisqueyanos [kiskeˈʝanos]), are an ethno-national people, a people of shared ancestry and culture, who have ancestral roots in the Dominican Republic.

The Dominican ethnic group was born out of a fusion of mostly European (mainly Spanish), Indigenous, and African elements, dating as far back as the 1500s, resulting in the vast majority of Dominicans being of mixed-race heritage. Dominicans trace their roots mainly to these three sources, the vast majority being mixed, and smaller numbers being predominantly European or African. The demonym Dominican is derived from Santo Domingo (Spanish equivalent Saint Dominic) and directly inherited from the name of the Captaincy General of Santo Domingo, which was synonymous with the island of Hispaniola as a whole and centered in the city of Santo Domingo, the capital of modern Dominican Republic. Recent immigrants and their children, who are legal citizens of the Dominican Republic, can be considered "Dominican" by nationality but not ethnicity due to not having ancestral roots in the country.

"Dominican" was historically the name for the inhabitants of the Captaincy General of Santo Domingo, the site of the first Spanish settlement in the Western Hemisphere. The majority of Dominicans primarily trace their origin to the Captaincy General's European settlers, with Indigenous and African influences.

The majority of Dominicans reside in the Dominican Republic, while there is also a large Dominican diaspora, mainly in the United States and Spain. The total population of the Dominican Republic in 2016 was estimated by the National Bureau of Statistics of the Dominican Republic at 10.2 million, with 9.3 million of those being natives of the country, and the rest being of foreign origin.

== Name ==
Historically the Dominican Republic was known as Santo Domingo, the name of its present capital and its patron saint, Saint Dominic. Hence the residents were called "Dominicanos" (Dominicans). The revolutionaries named their newly independent country "La República Dominicana". It was often referred to as the "Republic of San Domingo" in English language 19th century publications.

== History ==
=== Pre-European history ===
Prior to European colonization, the Indigenous inhabitants of the island belonged to multiple peoples, including the Macorix, the Ciguayos, and the Xaraguá-speaking Taíno, seafaring peoples who likely moved into Hispaniola from the north-east region of South America, displacing earlier inhabitants, c. AD 650. The Native Tainos divided the island into several chiefdoms and engaged in farming, fishing, as well as hunting, and gathering.

The Spaniards arrived in 1492. Columbus and his crew were the first recorded Europeans to encounter the Taíno people. Columbus described them as a physically tall and well-proportioned people, with a noble character. After initially amicable relationships, the Taínos fought against the conquest, led by the female Chief Anacaona of Xaraguá and her ex-husband Chief Caonabo of Maguana, as well as Chiefs Guacanagaríx, Guamá, Hatuey, and Enriquillo. The latter's successes gained his people an autonomous enclave for a time on the island. Within a few years after the 1492 arrival, the Indigenous population had declined drastically, due to smallpox, measles, and other diseases that arrived with the Europeans. Census records from 1514 reveal that at least 40% of Spanish men in Santo Domingo were married to Indigenous women, and many present-day Dominicans have significant Indigenous ancestry.

=== European colonization ===
Christopher Columbus arrived on the island in December 5, 1492, during the first of his four voyages to the Americas. He claimed the land for Spain and named it La Española due to its diverse climate and terrain which reminded him of the Spanish landscape. In 1496, Bartholomew Columbus, Christopher's brother, built the city of Santo Domingo, Western Europe's first permanent colonization in the "New World." The colony thus became the springboard for the further Spanish conquest of America and for decades the headquarters of Spanish colonial power in the hemisphere.

In 1501, the colony began to import African slaves. In 1697, after decades of armed struggles with the French, Spain ceded the western coast of the island to France with the Treaty of Ryswick, whilst the Central Plateau remained under Spanish domain.

By the middle of the 18th century, the population was bolstered by European emigration from the Canary Islands, resettling the northern part of the colony and planting tobacco in the Cibao Valley, and importation of slaves was renewed. After 1700, with the arrival of new Spanish colonists, the African holocaust resumed. However, as industry moved from sugar to cattle ranching, racial and caste divisions became less important, eventually leading to a blend of cultures—Spanish, African, and Indigenous—which would form the basis of national identity for Dominicans. It is estimated that the population of the colony in 1777 was 400,000, of which 100,000 were European, 70,000 African, 100,000 European/Indigenous mestizo, 60,000 African/Indigenous mestizo, and 70,000 African/European.

Dominican privateers in the service of the Spanish Crown captured British, Dutch, French and Danish ships in the Caribbean Sea throughout the 18th century.

=== Independence ===
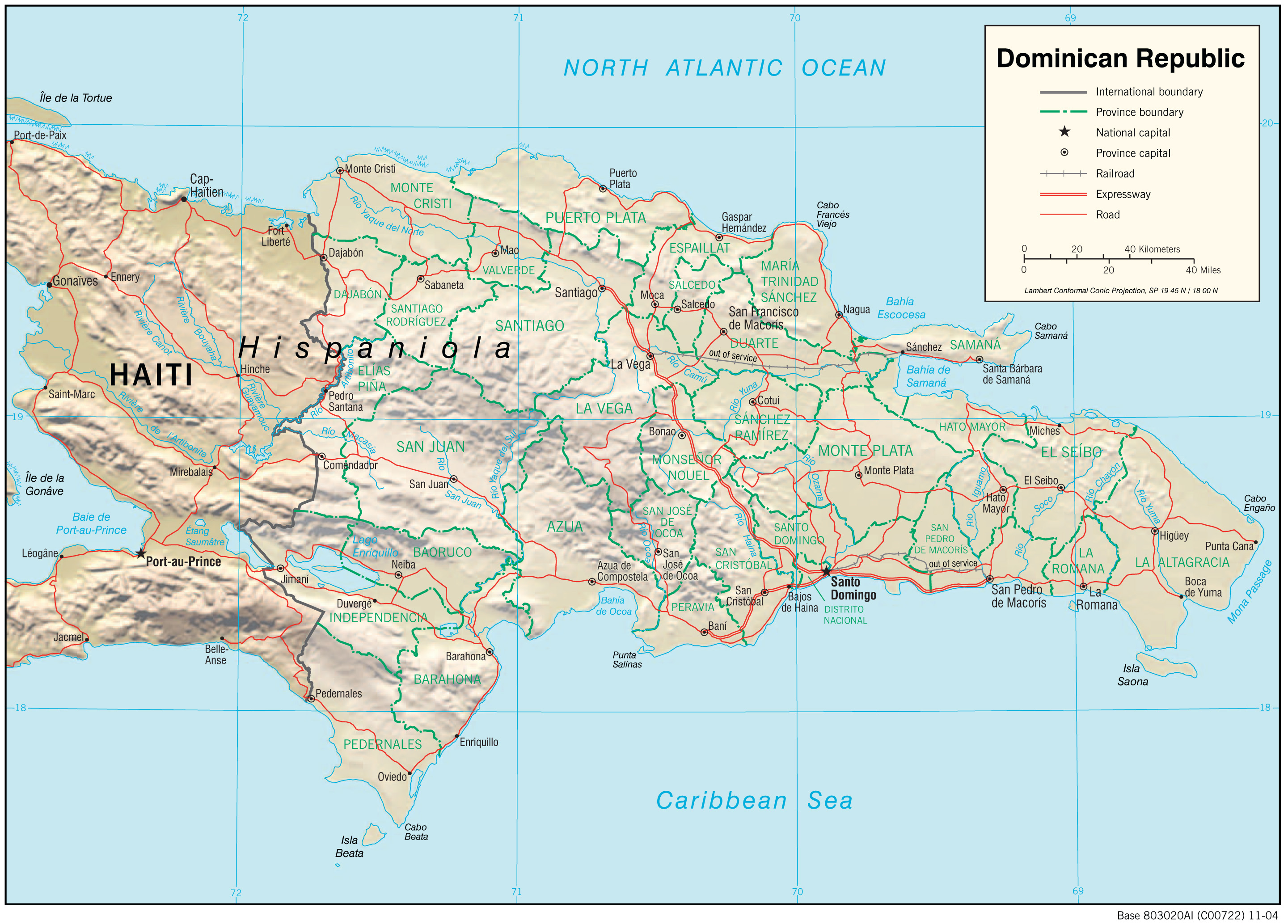
Map of the Dominican Republic

Santo Domingo attained independence as the Dominican Republic in 1844 from the Haitian government. In 1861, the Dominicans voluntarily returned to the Spanish Empire, but two years later they launched a war that restored independence in 1865. A legacy of unsettled, mostly non-representative rule followed, capped by the dictatorship of Rafael Trujillo from 1930 to 1961. Trujillo's regime carried out killings of thousands of Haitians and committed crimes in the United States, Cuba, Puerto Rico, Venezuela, Guatemala, Costa Rica, and Mexico. Raids on the national treasury enabled Trujillo to amass a net worth of 800 million dollars (5.3 billion dollars today). It has been estimated that Trujillo's tyrannical rule was responsible for the death of more than 50,000 Dominicans. The Dominican Civil War of 1965 was ended by a United States-led intervention, and was followed by the authoritarian rule of Joaquín Balaguer, the leader from 1966 to 1978. Since that time, the Dominican Republic has moved steadily toward representative democracy.

== Genetics and ethnicities ==
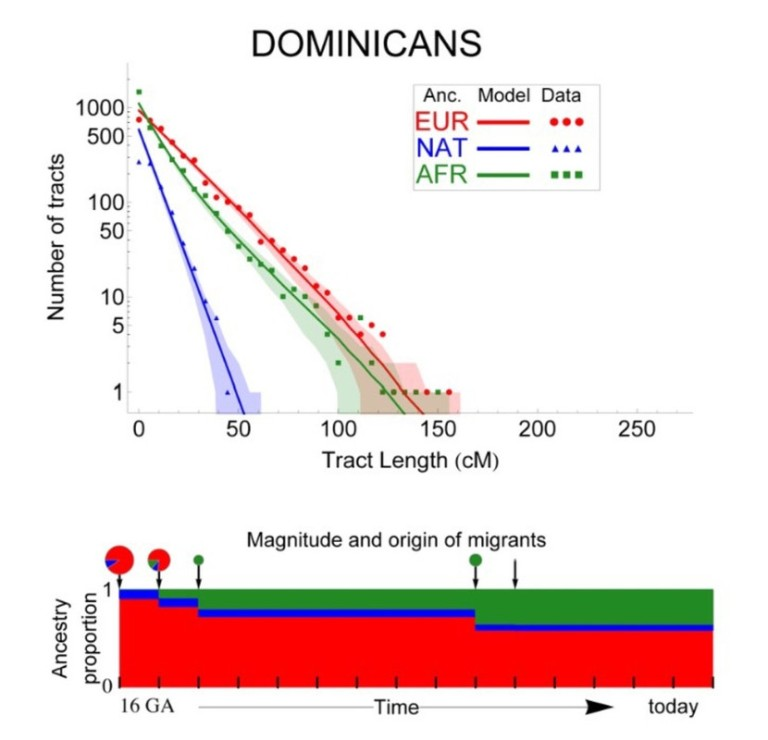
Timeline of the Dominican Republic's genetic make-up since 500 years ago showing the impact of migrations. The founder Dominican population was mostly European in origin with some Indigenous element, but was modified by subsequent African inflows. European DNA Native American DNA Sub-Saharan African DNA

According to recent genealogical DNA studies of the Dominican population, the genetic makeup is predominantly European and Sub-Saharan African, with a lesser degree of Native American ancestry. The average DNA admixture of the founder Dominican population was 73% European, 10% Native, and 17% African, but due to the Transatlantic slave trade and the migration from other Afro-Caribbean countries, the current overall admixture is 50%-60% European, 8-10% Native and 30%-40% African.

=== 2022 census ===
Responses for the 2022 census population of 12 years old and above. National Statistics Office.

Ethnic-racial group (skin color)	Population	%
Indio/a (Note: The term "indio" in the Dominican Republic is not associated with people of indigenous ancestry but people of mixed ancestry or skin color between light and dark)	2,946,377	34.2
Moreno/a	2,237,370	26.1
White	1,611,752	18.7
Mestizo/a	665,387	7.7
Black	642,018	7.5
Mulatto/a	330,207	3.8
Asian	28,343	0.3
Other	31,802	0.3
Don't know / no response	123,039	1.4
Total	8,616,295	100

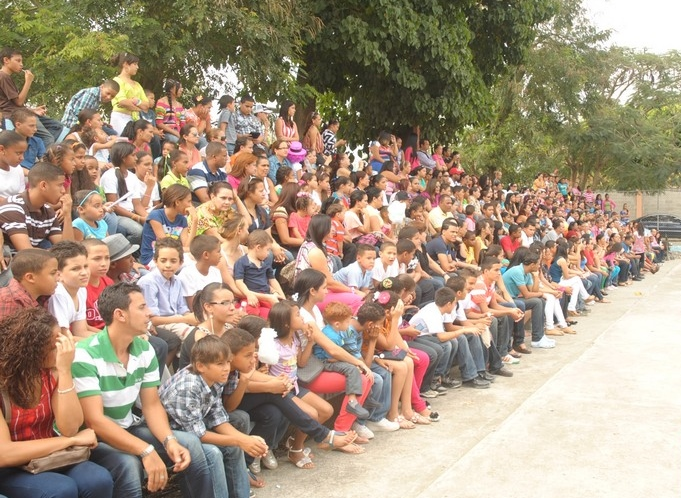
Dominican people in the town of Moca.

A previous survey published in 2021, shows this results(Indio (Note: The term "indio" in the Dominican Republic is not associated with people of indigenous ancestry but people of mixed ancestry or skin color between light and dark) 45%, moreno 25%, jabao 2%, 18% as white, 8% Afro-Dominicans, and 0.5% as "other". Previously, in the 1996 electoral roll, 82.5% of the adult population were Indio, 7.55% white, 4.13% black, and 2.3% mulatto. Other estimates puts the Dominican population at 60% mixed, 35% black, and 5% white.

Other groups in the country include the descendants of West Asians—mostly Lebanese, Syrians and Palestinians. A smaller, yet significant presence of East Asians (primarily ethnic Chinese and Japanese) can also be found throughout the population. Dominicans are also composed of Sephardic Jews that were exiled from Spain and the Mediterranean area in 1492 and 1497, coupled with other migrations dating to the 1700s and during the Second World War contribute to Dominican ancestry.

In recent times, Dominican and Puerto Rican researchers identified in the current Dominican population the presence of genes belonging to the aborigines of the Canary Islands (commonly called Guanches). These types of genes have also been detected in Puerto Rico.

Genetic ancestry of Dominican population
Study	Year	Caucasoid	SSA	Amerindian
Genome-wide patterns of population structure and admixture among Hispanic/Latino populations	2010	51%	42%	7%
Reconstructing the Population Genetic History of the Caribbean	2013	57%	35%	8%
Unravelling the hidden ancestry of American admixed populations	2015	52%	40%	8%
A continuum of admixture in the Western Hemisphere revealed by the African Diaspora genome	2016	52%	38%	10%
Admixture in the Americas: Regional and National Differences	2016	47%	42%	12%
Y Haplogroup Diversity of the DR: Reconstructing the Effect of the European Colonization and the Trans-Atlantic Slave Trades	2020	59%	38%	3%
Admixture mapping of peripheral artery disease in a Dominican population reveals a putative risk locus on 2q35	2023	56%	37%	6%

=== In Dominican Republic ===
Dominican Republic employs the jus sanguinis nationality law principle, unlike majority of other countries in the Americas. Therefore, citizenship is inherited through at least one parent or legal guardian who is a Dominican citizens or alternatively by invoking and proving one's ancestral link to the country. This means that being a Dominican citizen and being an ethnic Dominican is not always interchangeable, as the former implies citizenship that one can receive moving from any country in the world to Dominican Republic, while the latter implies a people tied by ancestry and culture. Ethnic Dominicans are people who are not only born in Dominican Republic (and have legal status) or born abroad with ancestral roots in the country, but more importantly have family roots in the country going back several generations and descend from a mix of varying degrees of Spanish, Indigenous, and African, the three principal foundational roots of Dominican Republic. Nearly all Dominicans are mixed race, with 75% being "visibly" and "evenly" mixed, and the remaining 25% being predominantly of African or European blood. According to a 2017 estimate from the Dominican government, Dominican Republic had a population of 10,189,895, of which 847,979 were immigrants or descendants of recent immigrants and 9,341,916 were ethnic Dominicans.

== Immigration in the 20th and 21st centuries ==
In the twentieth century, many Chinese, Arabs (primarily from Lebanon and Syria), Japanese and to a lesser degree Koreans settled in the country, working as agricultural laborers and merchants. Waves of Chinese immigrants, the latter ones fleeing the Chinese Communist People's Liberation Army (PLA), arrived and worked in mines and building railroads. The current Chinese Dominican population totals 50,000 (2010 year). The Arab community is also rising at an increasing rate.

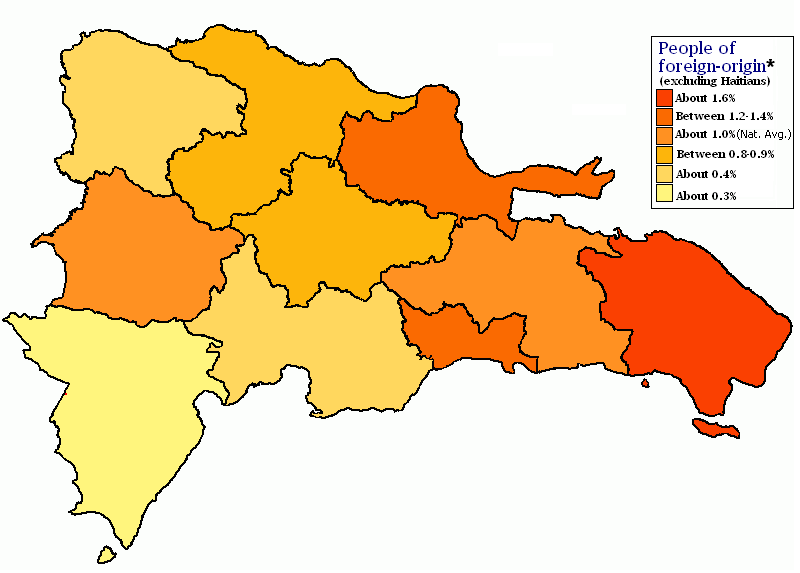
Population of foreign origin (excluding Haitians) in the Dominican Republic, by regions.

In addition, there are descendants of immigrants who came from other Caribbean islands, including Saint Kitts and Nevis, Dominica, Antigua, St. Vincent, Montserrat, Tortola, St. Croix, St. Thomas, Martinique, and Guadeloupe. They worked on sugarcane plantations and docks and settled mainly in the cities of San Pedro de Macorís and Puerto Plata, they have a population of 28,000. There is an increasing number of Puerto Rican immigrants in and around Santo Domingo; they are believed to number at about 10,000. Before and during World War II 800 Jewish refugees moved to the Dominican Republic, and many of their descendants live in the town of Sosúa. Nationwide, there are an estimated 100 Jews left. 82,000 Americans (in 1999), 40,000 Italians, 1,900 French, and 800 Germans.

The 2010 Census registered 311,969 Haitians; 24,457 Americans; 6,691 Spaniards; 5,763 Puerto Ricans; and 5,132 Venezuelans.

In 2012, the Dominican government made a survey of immigrants in the country and found that there were: 329,281 Haitian-born; 25,814 U. S.-born (excluding Puerto Rican-born); 7,062 Spanish-born; 6,083 Puerto Rican-born; 5,417 Venezuelan-born; 3,841 Cuban-born; 3,795 Italian-born; 3,606 Colombian-born; 2,043 French-born; 1,661 German-born; 1,484 Chinese-born; among others.

In the second half of 2017, a second survey of foreign population was conducted in the Dominican Republic. The total population in the Dominican Republic was estimated at 10,189,895, of which 9,341,916 were Dominicans with no foreign background. According to the survey, the majority of the people with foreign background were of Haitian origin (751,080 out of 847,979, or 88.6%), breaking down as follows: 497,825 were Haitians born in Haiti, 171,859 Haitians born in the Dominican Republic and 81,590 Dominicans with a Haitian parent. Other main sources of foreign-born population were Venezuela (25,872), the United States (10,016), Spain (7,592), Italy (3,713), China (3,069), Colombia (2,642), Puerto Rico (2,356), and Cuba (2,024).

== Emigration ==
=== United States ===
The first recorded person of Dominican descent to migrate to what is now known as the United States was sailor-turned-merchant Juan Rodriguez. He arrived on Manhattan in 1613 from his home in Santo Domingo, which makes him the first non-Native American person to spend substantial time in the island. He also became the first Dominican, the first Latino, first Caribbean and the first person with European (specifically Portuguese) and African ancestry to settle in what is present day New York City.

Dominican emigration to the United States continued throughout the centuries. Recent research from the CUNY Dominican Studies Institute has documented some 5,000 Dominican emigrants who were processed through Ellis Island between 1892 and 1924.

During the second half of the twentieth century, there were three significant waves of immigration to the United States. The first period began in 1961, when a coalition of high-ranking Dominicans, with assistance from the CIA, assassinated General Rafael Trujillo, the nation's military dictator. In the wake of his death, fear of retaliation by Trujillo's allies, and political uncertainty in general, spurred migration from the island. In 1965, the United States began a military occupation of the Dominican Republic and eased travel restrictions, making it easier for Dominicans to obtain American visas. From 1966 to 1978, the exodus continued, fueled by high unemployment and political repression. Communities established by the first wave of immigrants to the U.S. created a network that assisted subsequent arrivals. In the early 1980s, unemployment, inflation, and the rise in the value of the dollar all contributed to the third and largest wave of emigration from the island nation, this time mostly from the lower-class. Today, emigration from the Dominican Republic remains high, facilitated by the social networks of now-established Dominican communities in the United States.

Besides the United States, significant numbers of Dominicans have also settled in Spain and in the nearby U.S. territory of Puerto Rico.

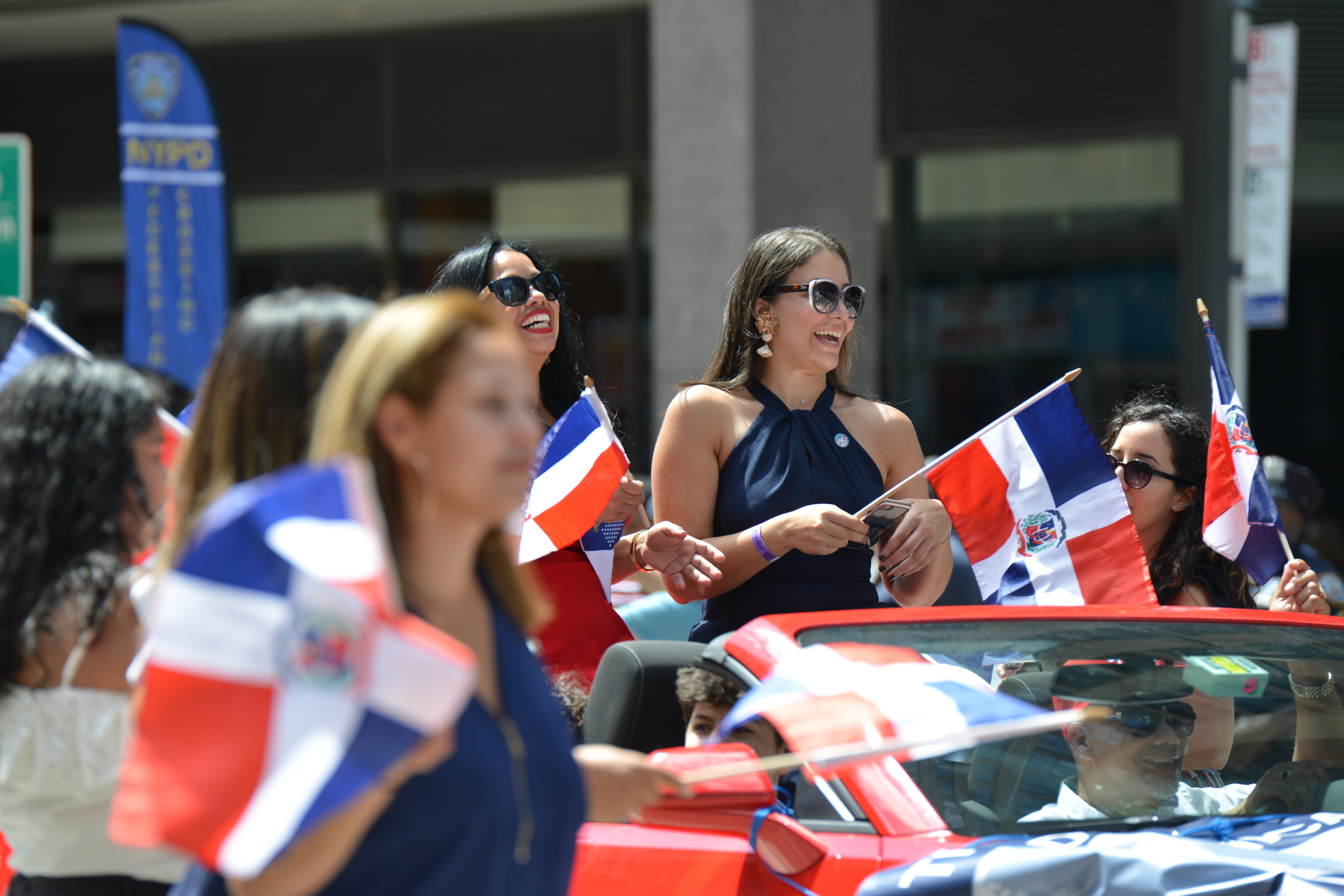
Dominicans in New York Dominican Day Parade.

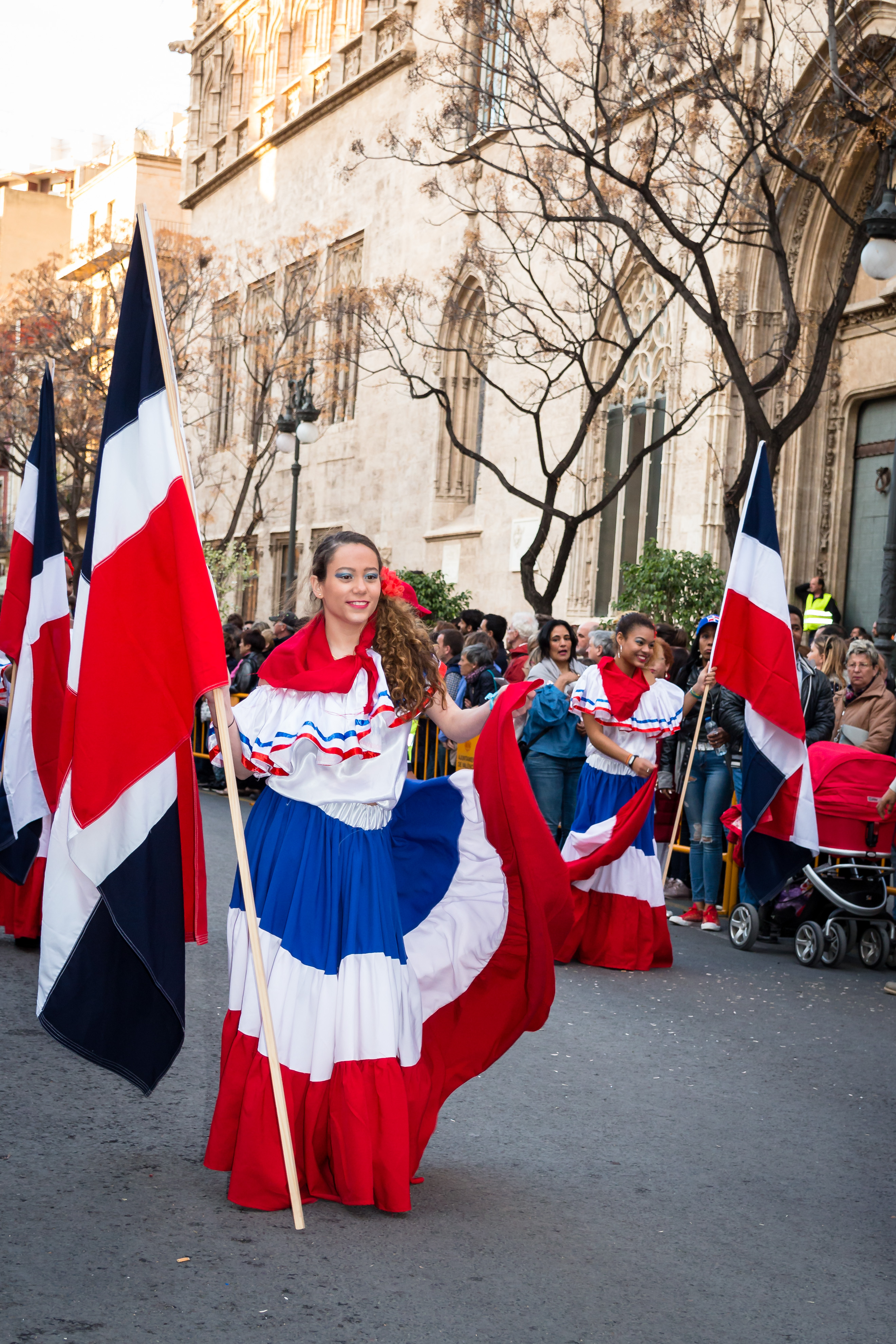
Dominicans in Spain dance in culture parade of Valencia.

=== Dominican Emigration ===
Top Dominican Emigration (2022)
Rank	Country	Dominican Population
1	United States	2,453,185
2	Spain	158,393
3	Italy	43,012
4	Venezuela	14,972
5	Switzerland	11,154
6	Germany	11,127
7	Canada	9,823
8	Netherlands	9,383
9	Panama	8,358
10	Haiti	5,110
11	France	3,544
12	Austria	3,441
13	Mexico	2,043
14	Antigua and Barbuda	1,819
15	United Kingdom	1,217
16	Uruguay	1,117
17	Costa Rica	1,104
18	Norway	856
19	Belgium	745
20	Sweden	741
21	Argentina	709
22	Greece	555
23	Colombia	410
24	Brazil	381
25	Ecuador	363
26	(The Bahamas) Bahamas	303
27	Chile	289
28	Finland	204
29	Australia	187
30	Denmark	187
31	Peru	185

=== Dominican Immigration ===
Top Countries Immigration to the Dominican Republic (2022)
Rank	Country	Population in the Dominican Republic
1	Haiti	496,112
2	Venezuela	34,063
3	United States	14,626
4	Spain	7,272
5	Italy	4,375
6	China	3,942
7	France	3,894
8	Cuba	3,402
9	Colombia	2,962
10	Germany	1,938
11	Mexico	1,563
12	Peru	1,489
13	Canada	1,267
14	Argentina	1,116
15	Switzerland	1,088
16	Panama	789
17	Brazil	671
18	Chile	661
19	Netherlands	617
20	Ecuador	605
21	South Korea	587
22	United Kingdom	503
23	Russia	503
24	Guatemala	446
25	Honduras	442
26	Japan	359
27	Costa Rica	320
28	Nicaragua	303
29	El Salvador	278
30	Belgium	266

== Culture ==
The culture of the Dominican Republic, like its Caribbean neighbors, is a blend of the cultures of the European settlers, African slaves and settlers, and Taíno natives. Spanish is the official language. Other languages, such as English, French, German, Italian, and Chinese are also spoken to varying degrees. European, African, and Taíno cultural elements are most prominent in food, family structure, religion, and music. Many Arawak/Taíno names and words are used in daily conversation and for many foods native to the Dominican Republic.

=== National symbols ===
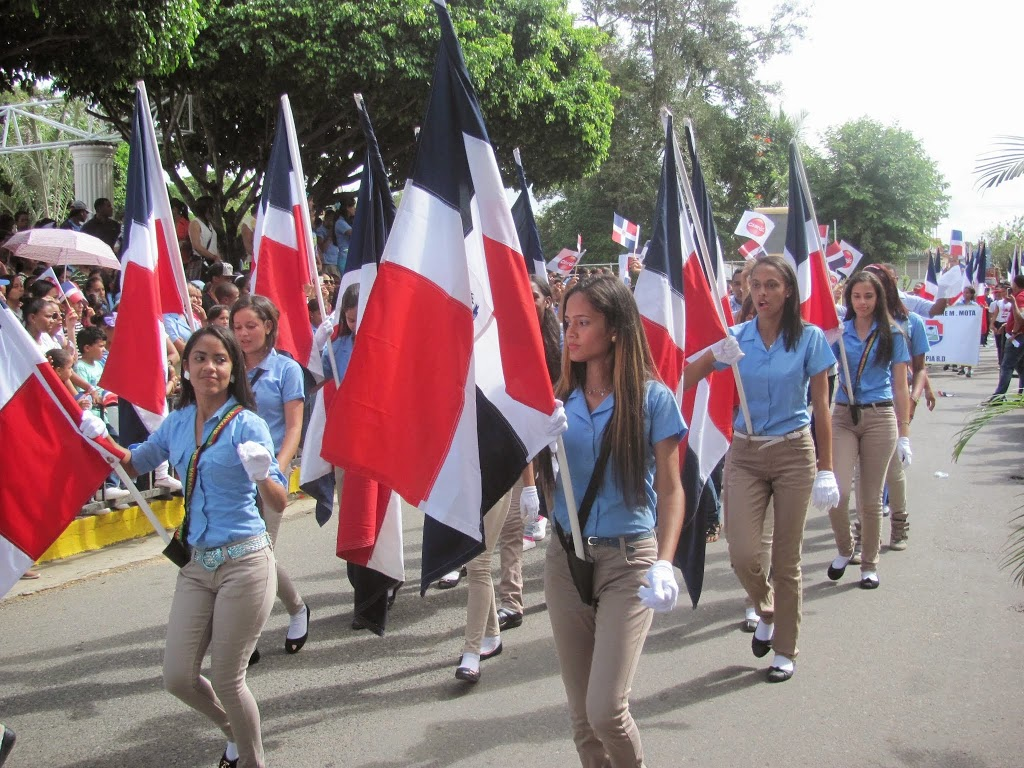
Dominican flag.

Some of the Dominican Republic's important symbols are the flag, the coat of arms, and the national anthem, titled Himno Nacional. The flag has a large white cross that divides it into four quarters. Two quarters are red and two are blue. Red represents the blood shed by the liberators. Blue expresses God's protection over the nation. The white cross symbolizes the struggle of the liberators to bequeath future generations a free nation. An alternative interpretation is that blue represents the ideals of progress and liberty, whereas white symbolizes peace and unity among Dominicans.

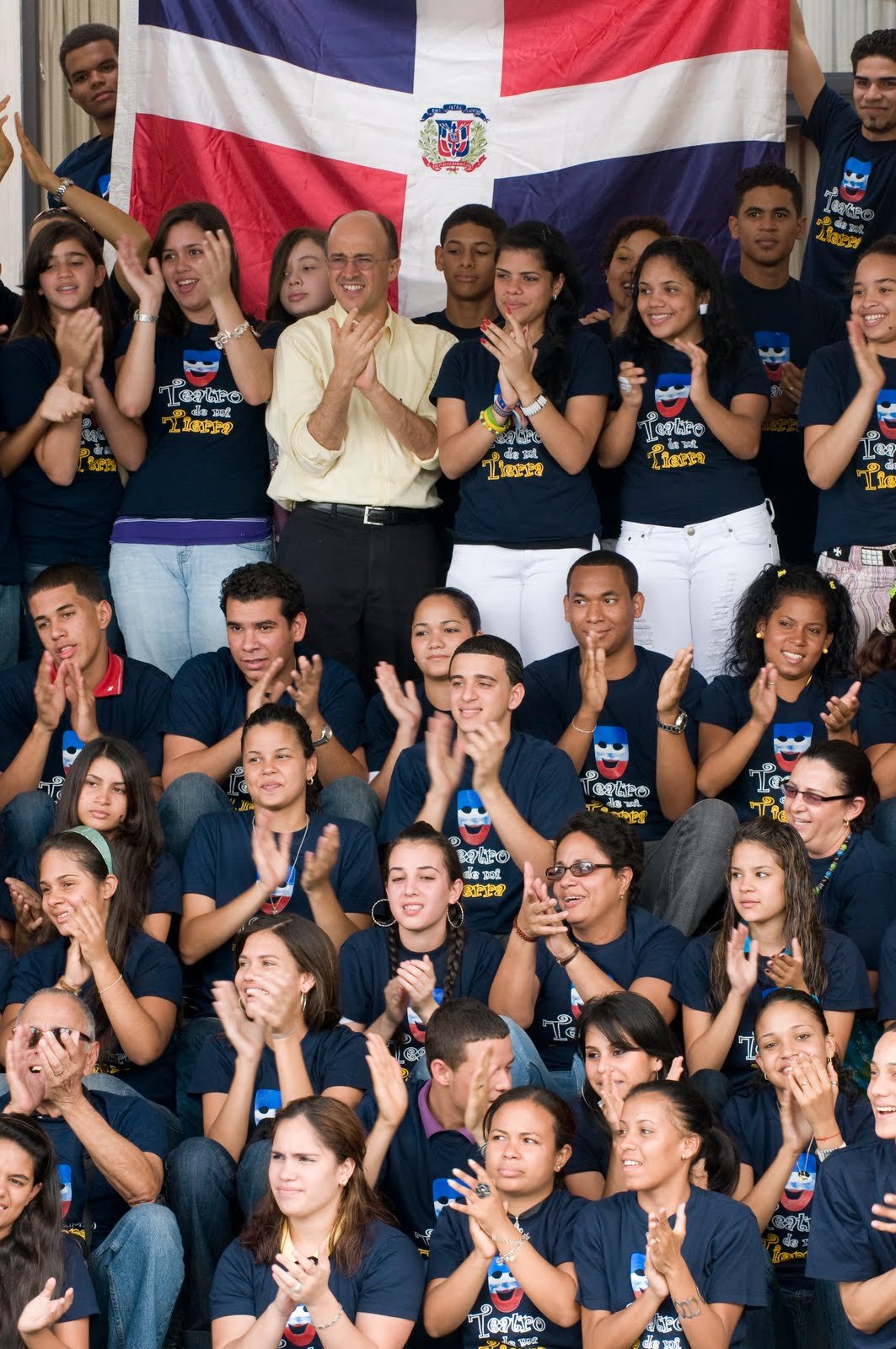
Dominicans in Santiago de los Caballeros.

In the center of the cross is the Dominican coat of arms, in the same colors as the national flag. The coat of arms pictures a red, white, and blue flag-draped shield with a Bible, a gold cross, and arrows; the shield is surrounded by an olive branch (on the left) and a palm branch (on the right). The Bible traditionally represents the truth and the light. The gold cross symbolizes the redemption from slavery, and the arrows symbolize the noble soldiers and their proud military. A blue ribbon above the shield reads, "Dios, Patria, Libertad" (meaning "God, Fatherland, Liberty"). A red ribbon under the shield reads, "República Dominicana" (meaning "Dominican Republic"). Out of all the flags in the world, the depiction of a Bible is unique to the Dominican flag.

The national flower is the Bayahibe Rose and the national tree is the West Indian Mahogany. The national bird is the Cigua Palmera or Palmchat ("Dulus dominicus").

=== Language ===
Spanish is the predominant language in the Dominican Republic; the local dialect is called Dominican Spanish, it closely resembles Canarian Spanish, Andalusian Spanish, and has influences from Arawak languages. Schools are based on a Spanish educational model, with English and French being taught as secondary languages in both private and public schools. Haitian Creole is spoken by the population of Haitian descent. There is a community of about 8,000 speakers of Samaná English in the Samaná Peninsula. They are the descendants of formerly-enslaved African Americans who arrived in the 19th century. Tourism, American pop culture, the influence of Dominican Americans, and the country's economic ties with the United States motivate other Dominicans to learn English.

=== Religion ===
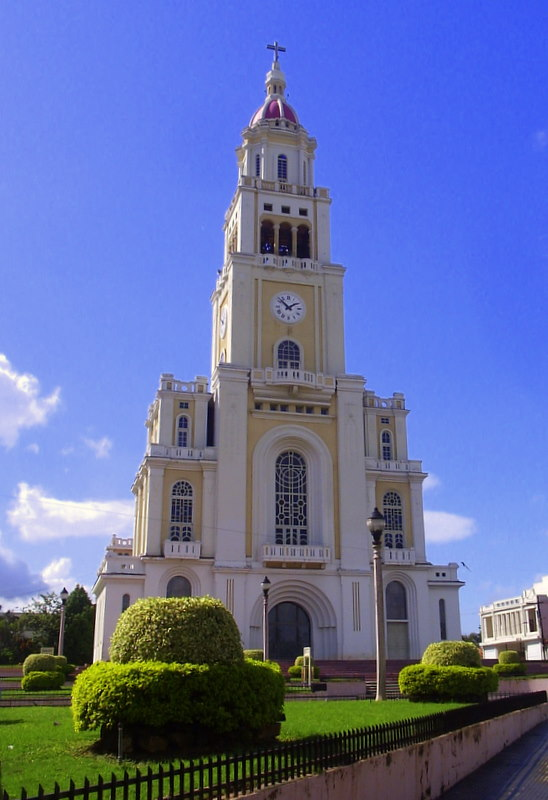
Iglesia Sagrado Corazón de Jesus in Moca, Dominican Republic.

The Dominican Republic is 80% Christian, including 57% Roman Catholic and 23% Protestant. Recent but small scale immigration, as well as proselytizing, has brought other religions, with the following shares of the population: Spiritist: 1.2%, The Church of Jesus Christ of Latter-day Saints: 1.1%, Buddhist: 0.10%, Baháʼí: 0.1%, Islam: 0.02%, Judaism: 0.01%, Chinese folk religion: 0.1%.

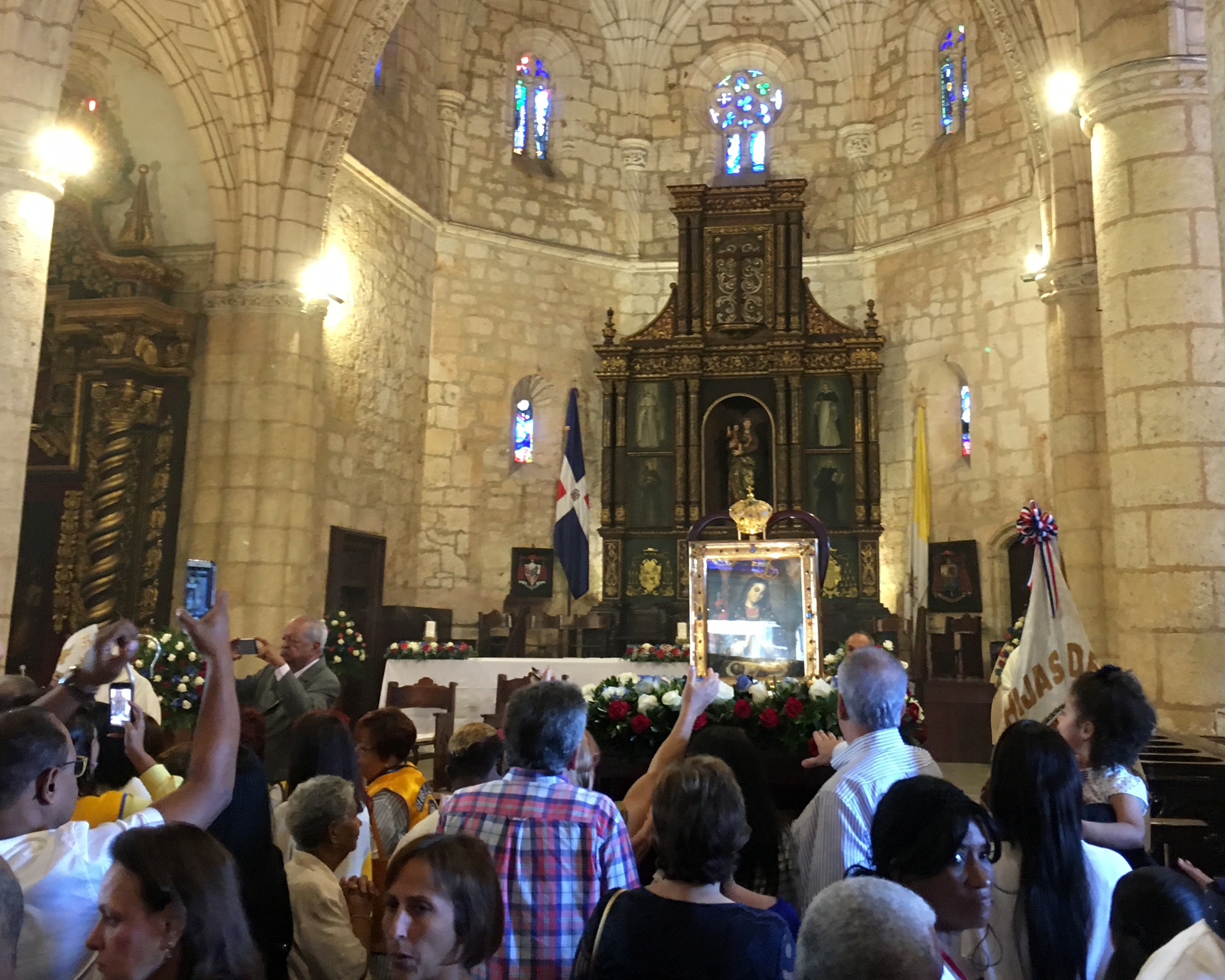
People attending mass in Cathedral of Santo Domingo.

Roman Catholicism was introduced by Columbus and Spanish missionaries. Religion was not really the foundation of their entire society, as it was in other parts of the world at the time, and most of the population did not attend church on a regular basis. Nonetheless, most of the education in the country was based upon the Catholic religion, as the Bible was required in the curricula of all public schools. Children would use religious-based dialogue when greeting a relative or parent. For example, a child would say "Bless me, mother", and the mother would reply "May God bless you". The nation has two patroness saints: Nuestra Señora de la Altagracia (Our Lady Of High Grace) is the patroness of the Dominican people, and Nuestra Señora de las Mercedes (Our Lady Of Mercy) is the patroness of the Dominican Republic. The Catholic Church began to lose popularity in the late nineteenth century. This was due to a lack of funding, of priests, and of support programs. During the same time, the Protestant evangelical movement began to gain support. Religious tension between Catholics and Protestants in the country has been rare.

There have always been religious freedom throughout the entire country. Not until the 1950s were restrictions placed upon churches by Trujillo. Letters of protest were sent against the mass arrests of government adversaries. Trujillo began a campaign against the church and planned to arrest priests and bishops who preached against the government. This campaign ended before it was even put into place, with his assassination.

Judaism appeared in the Dominican Republic in the late 1930s. During World War II, a group of Jews escaping Nazi Germany fled to the Dominican Republic and founded the city of Sosúa. It has remained the center of the Jewish population since.

=== Cuisine ===
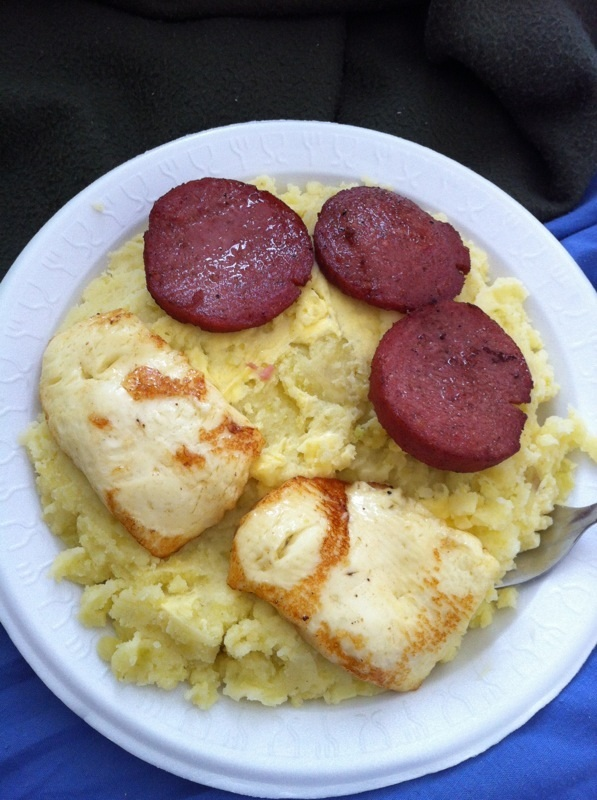
Mangu

Dominican cuisine is predominantly made up of a combination of Spanish, Native American, and African influences over the last few centuries. The typical cuisine is quite similar to what can be found in other Latin American countries, but many of the names of dishes are different. One breakfast dish consists of eggs and mangú (mashed, boiled plantain). For heartier versions, these are accompanied by deep-fried meat (typically Dominican salami) and/or cheese. Similarly to Spain, lunch is generally the largest and most important meal of the day. Lunch usually consists of rice, some type of meat (chicken, beef, pork, or fish), beans, plantains, and a side portion of salad. "La Bandera" (literally, The Flag), the most popular lunch dish, consists of meat and red beans on white rice. There is a famous soup, Sancocho, a typical national soup made with seven kinds of variety of meats.

Dominican cuisine usually accommodates all the food groups, incorporating meat or seafood; rice, potatoes, or plantains; and is accompanied by some other type of vegetable or salad. However, meals usually heavily favor starches and meats over dairy products and vegetables. Many dishes are made with sofrito, which is a mix of local herbs and spices sautéed to bring out all of the dish's flavors. Throughout the south-central coast, bulgur, or whole wheat, is a main ingredient in quipes or tipili (bulgur salad). Other favorite Dominican dishes include chicharrón, yuca, casabe, and pastelitos (empanadas), batata, pasteles en hoja, (ground-roots pockets) chimichurris, plátanos maduros (ripe plantain), and tostones.

Some treats Dominicans enjoy are arroz con dulce (or arroz con leche), bizcocho dominicano (lit. Dominican cake), habichuelas con dulce (sweet creamed beans), flan, frío frío (snow cones), dulce de leche, and caña (sugarcane).

The beverages Dominicans enjoy include Morir Soñando, rum, beer, Mama Juana, batida (smoothie), jugos naturales (freshly squeezed fruit juices), mabí, and coffee.

=== Music and dance ===
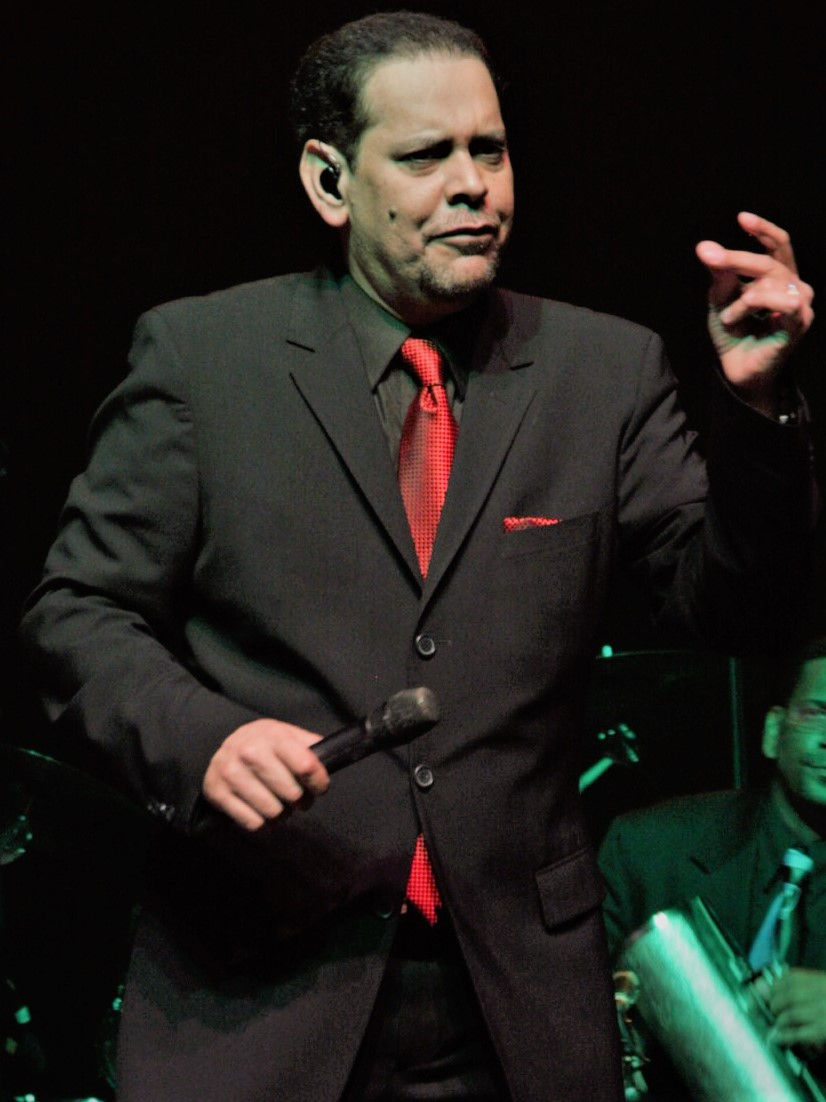
Dominican merengue singer Fernando Villalona

Musically, the Dominican Republic is known for the creation of the musical style called merengue, a type of lively, fast-paced rhythm and dance music consisting of a tempo of about 120 to 160 beats per minute (it varies wildly) based on musical elements like drums, brass, and chorded instruments, as well as some elements unique to the music style of the DR. It includes the use of the tambora (Dominican drum), accordion, and güira. Its syncopated beats use Latin percussion, brass instruments, bass, and piano or keyboard. Between 1937 and 1950 the merengue music was promoted internationally, by some Dominicans groups like, Billo's Caracas Boys, Chapuseaux and Damiron Los Reyes del Merengue, Joseito Mateo and others. Later on it was more popularized via television, radio and international media, well-known merengue singers include singer/songwriter Juan Luis Guerra, Fernando Villalona, Eddy Herrera, Sergio Vargas, Toño Rosario, Johnny Ventura, and Milly Quezada and Chichí Peralta. Merengue became popular in the United States, mostly on the East Coast, during the 1980s and 90s, when many Dominican artists, among them Victor Roque y La Gran Manzana, Henry Hierro, Zacarias Ferraira, Aventura, Milly, and Jocelyn Y Los Vecinos, residing in the U.S. (particularly New York City) started performing in the Latin club scene and gained radio airplay. The emergence of bachata, c along with an increase in the number of Dominicans living among other Latino groups in New York, New Jersey, and Florida have contributed to Dominican music's overall growth in popularity.

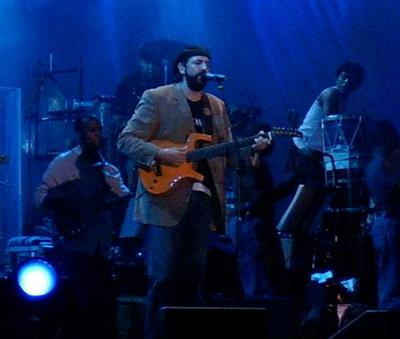
Dominican musician Juan Luis Guerra

Bachata, a form of music and dance that originated in the countryside and rural marginal neighborhoods of the Dominican Republic, has become quite popular in recent years. Its subjects are often romantic; especially prevalent are tales of heartbreak and sadness. In fact, the original name for the genre was amargue ("bitterness", or "bitter music", or blues music), until the rather ambiguous (and mood-neutral) term bachata became popular. Bachata grew out of and is still closely related to, the pan-Latin American romantic style called bolero. Over time, it has been influenced by merengue and by a variety of Latin American guitar styles.

Salsa music has had a great deal of popularity in the country. During the late 1960s Dominican musicians like Johnny Pacheco, creator of the Fania All Stars played a significant role in the development and popularization of the genre.

=== Visual arts ===
Lluvia en el mercado (English: Rain in the Market), 1942 (Museo de Arte Moderno, Santo Domingo).

Historically, the painting of this time were centered around images connected to national independence, historical scenes, portraits but also landscapes and images of still life. Styles of painting ranged between neoclassicism and romanticism. Between 1920 and 1940 the art scene was influenced by styles of realism and impressionism. Dominican artists were focused on breaking from previous, academic styles in order to develop more independent and individual styles. The artists of the times were Celeste Woss y Gil (1890–1985), Jaime Colson (1901–1975), Yoryi O. Morel (1906–1979) and Darío Suro (1917–1997).

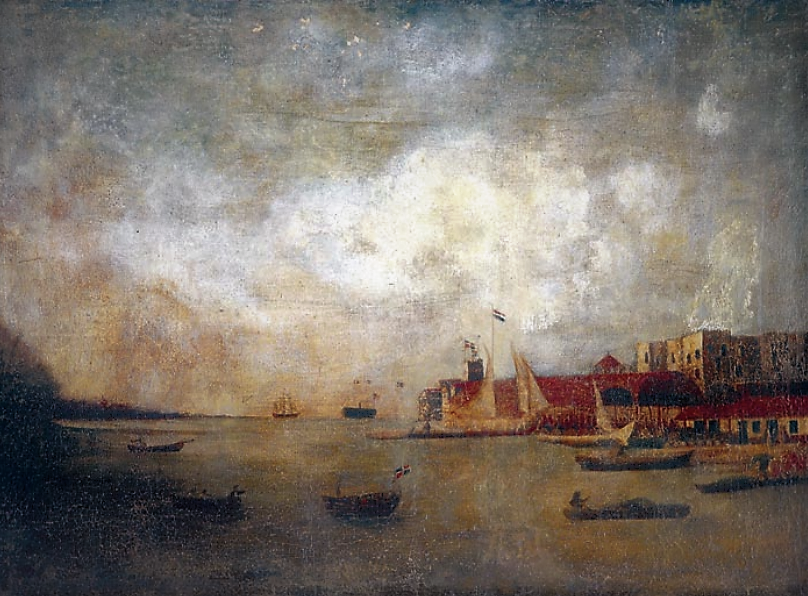
El Puerto sobre el Río Ozama. Alejandro Bonilla 1868

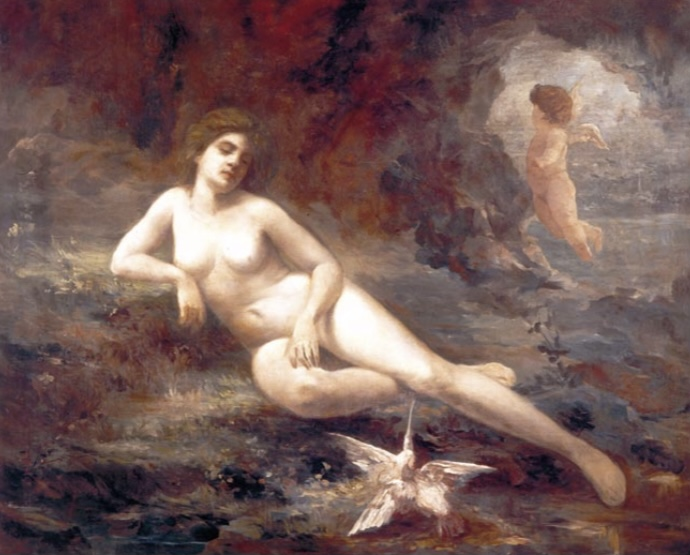
El amor que llega. Abelardo Rodriguez Urdaneta without date

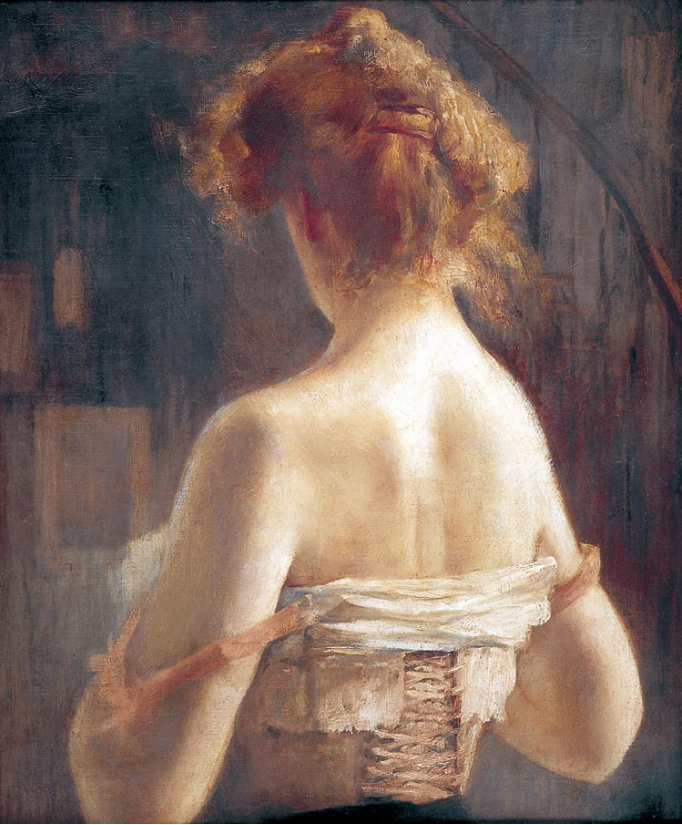
Abelardo Rodríguez Urdaneta. Urdaneta. Mujer de espalda. date unknown

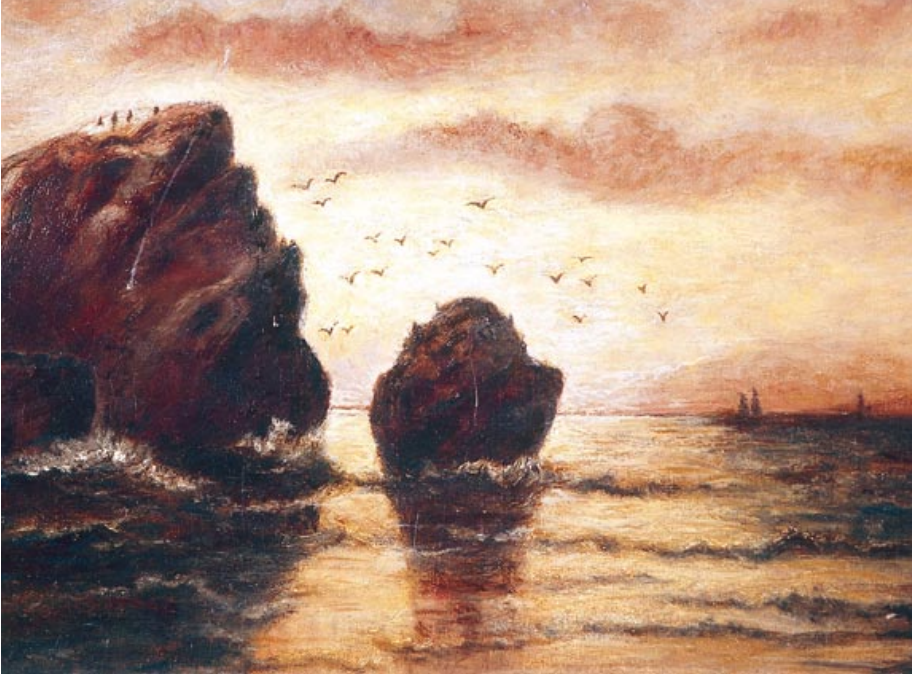
Abelardo Rodríguez Urdaneta. Marina. date unknown.

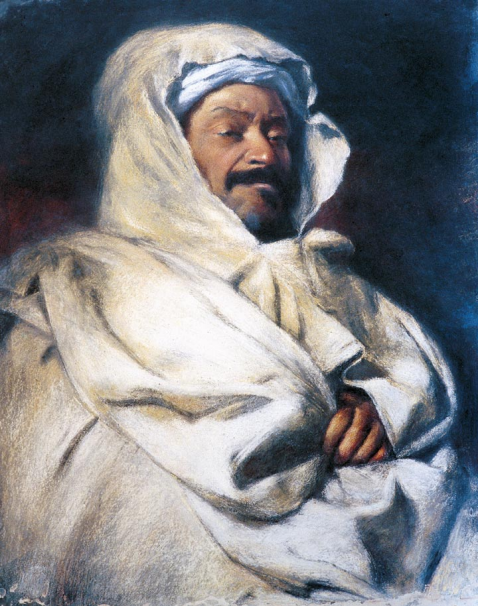
El Moro. Arturo Grullón. 1900

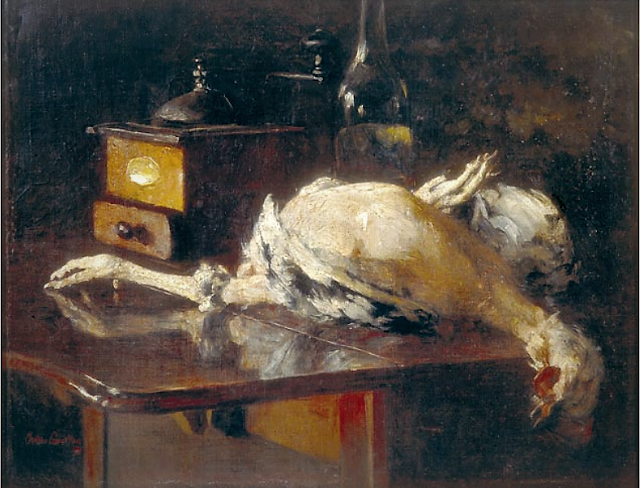
Arturo Grullon – Still life with bird, 1898

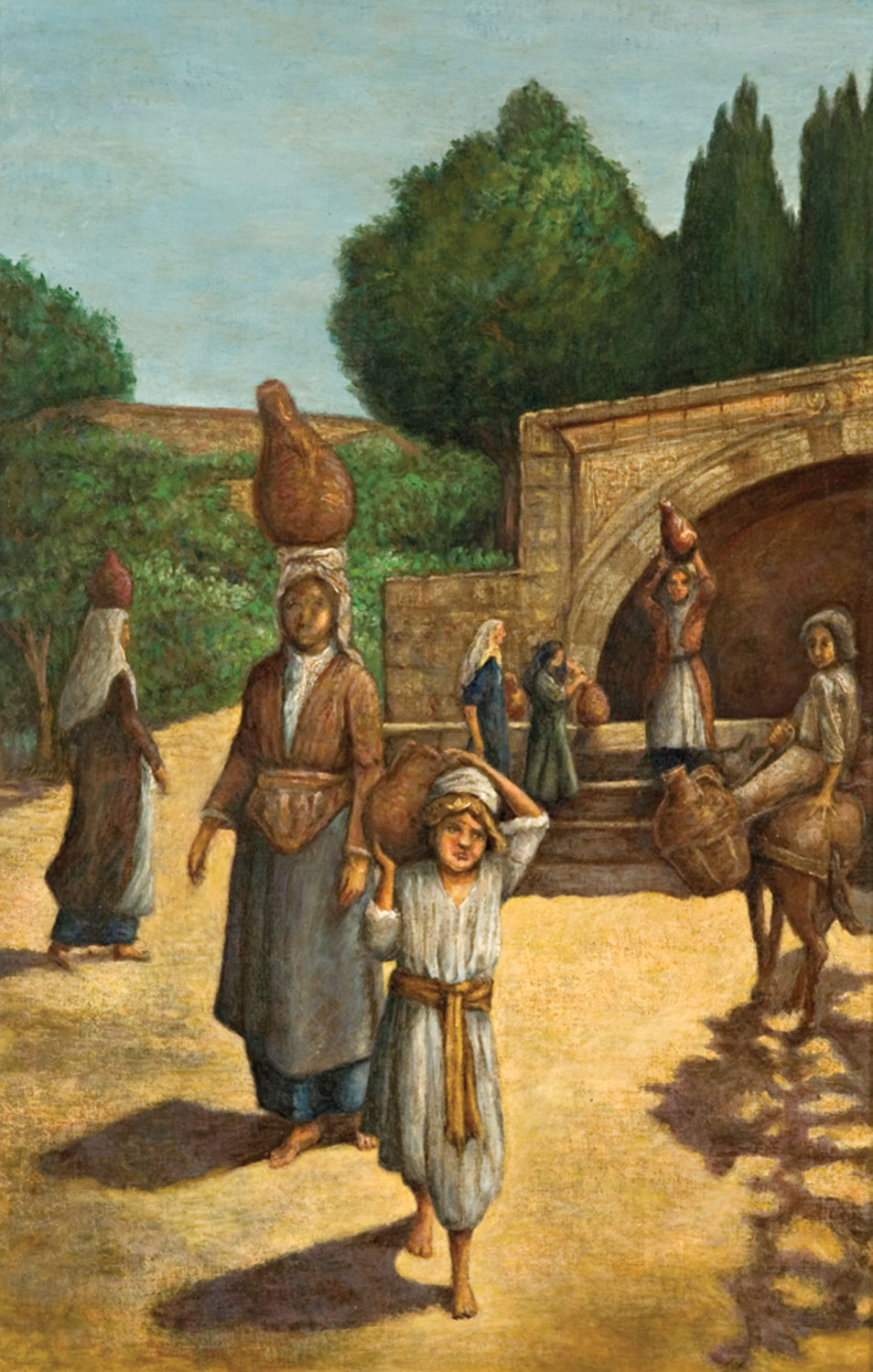
Arturo Grullon – Water from the fountain

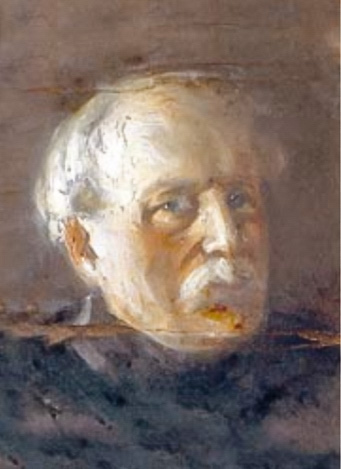
Grullon Retrato de Monsieur

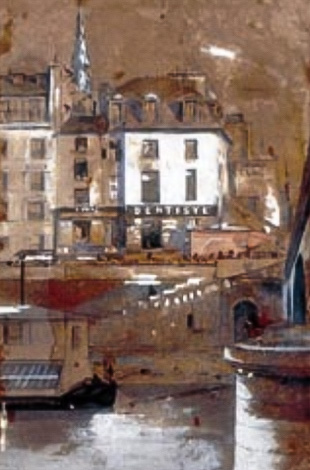
Grullón, Paisaje Urbano

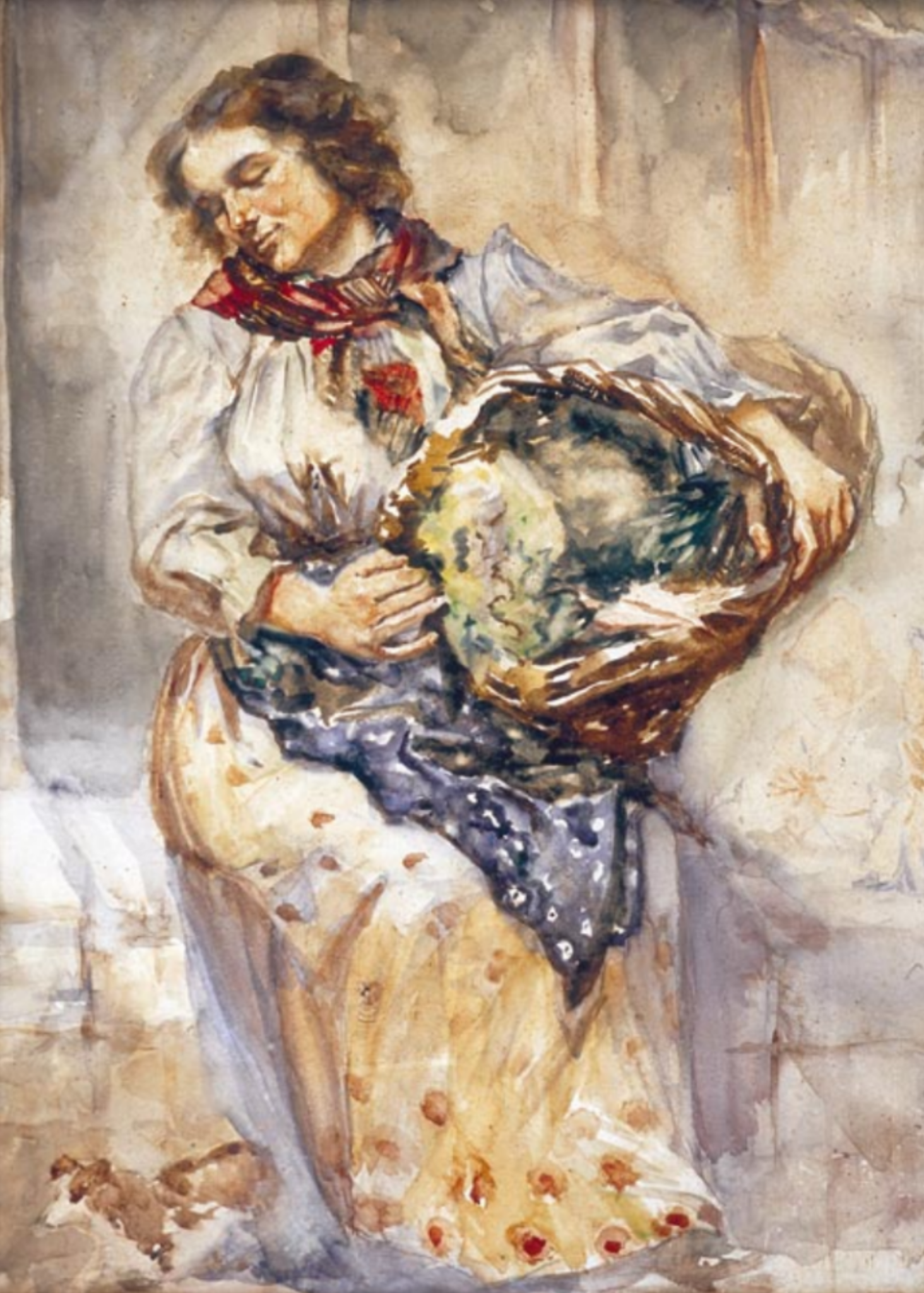
Canastera. Leopoldo Navarro 1900

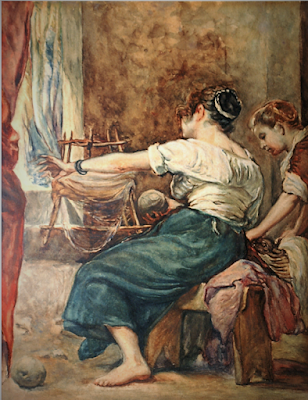
The Spinners Navarro

Between 1950 and 1970 Dominican art expressed the social and political conditions of the time. A need for a renewal of the image language emerged and, as a result, paintings were created in non-figurative, abstract, geometric and cubistic styles. The most notable artists included Paul Giudicelli (1921–1965), Clara Ledesma (1924–1999), Gilberto Hernandez Ortega (1924–1979), Gaspar Mario Cruz (1925–2006), Luichy M. Richiez (1928–2000), Eligio Pichardo (1929–1984), Domingo Liz (b. 1931), Silvano Lora (1934–2003), Cándido Bidó (1936–2011) and José Ramírez Conde (1940–1987).

=== Fashion ===
World-famous fashion designer Oscar de la Renta was born in the Dominican Republic in 1932 and became a US citizen in 1971. He studied under the leading Spanish designer Cristóbal Balenciaga and then worked with the house of Lanvin in Paris. Then by 1963, de la Renta had designs carrying his own label. After establishing himself in the US, de la Renta opened boutiques across the country. His work blends French and Spanish fashion with American styles. Although he settled in New York, de la Renta also marketed his work in Latin America, where it became very popular, and remained active in his native Dominican Republic, where his charitable activities and personal achievements earned him the Juan Pablo Duarte Order of Merit and the Order of Cristóbal Colón.

=== Sports ===
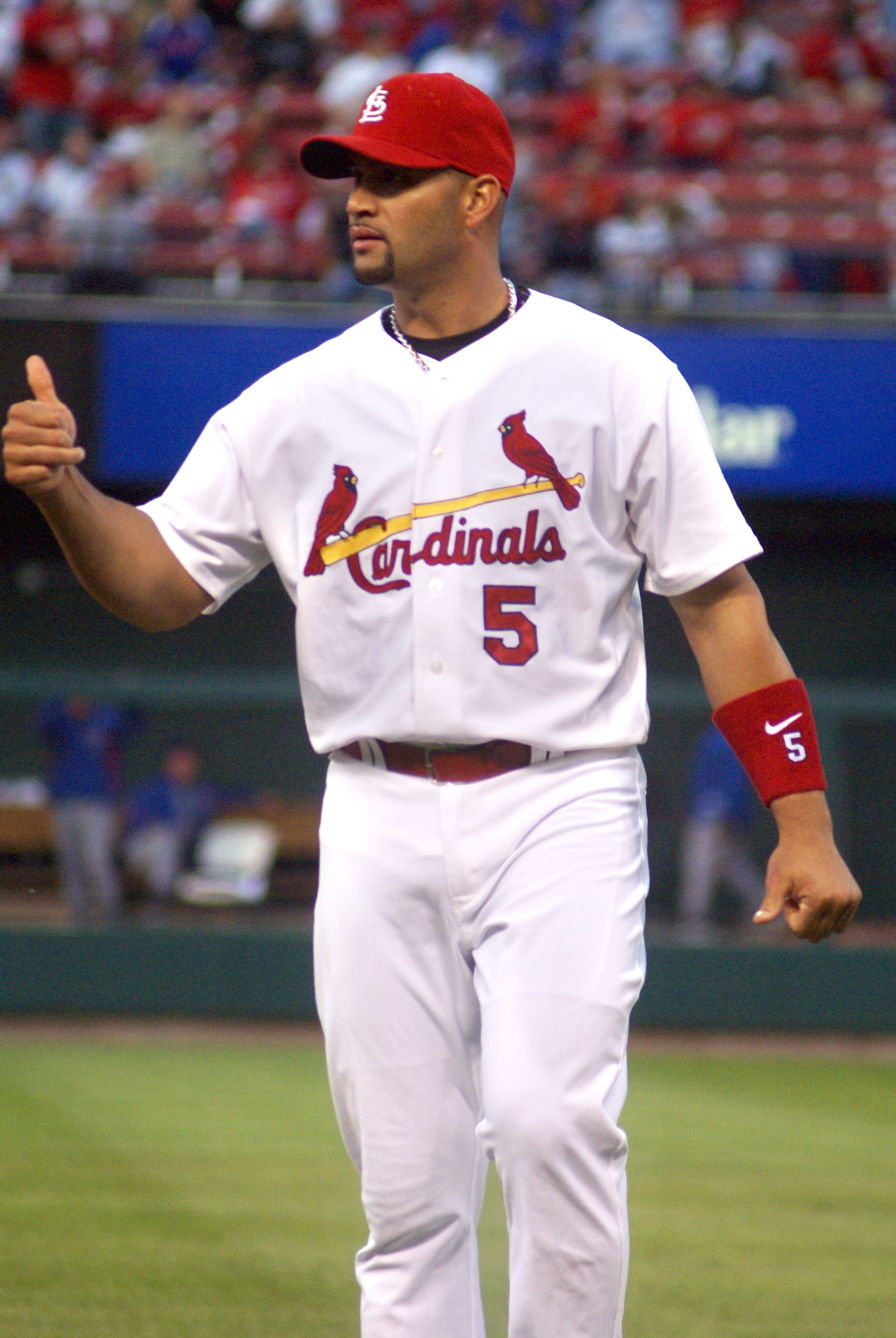
Dominican native and Major League Baseball player Albert Pujols

Baseball is by far the most popular sport in the Dominican Republic. After the United States, the Dominican Republic has the second-highest number of Major League Baseball (MLB) players. Some of these players have been regarded among the best in the game. Historically, the Dominican Republic has been linked to MLB since Ozzie Virgil Sr. became the first Dominican to play in the league. Juan Marichal is the first Dominican-born player in the Baseball Hall of Fame.

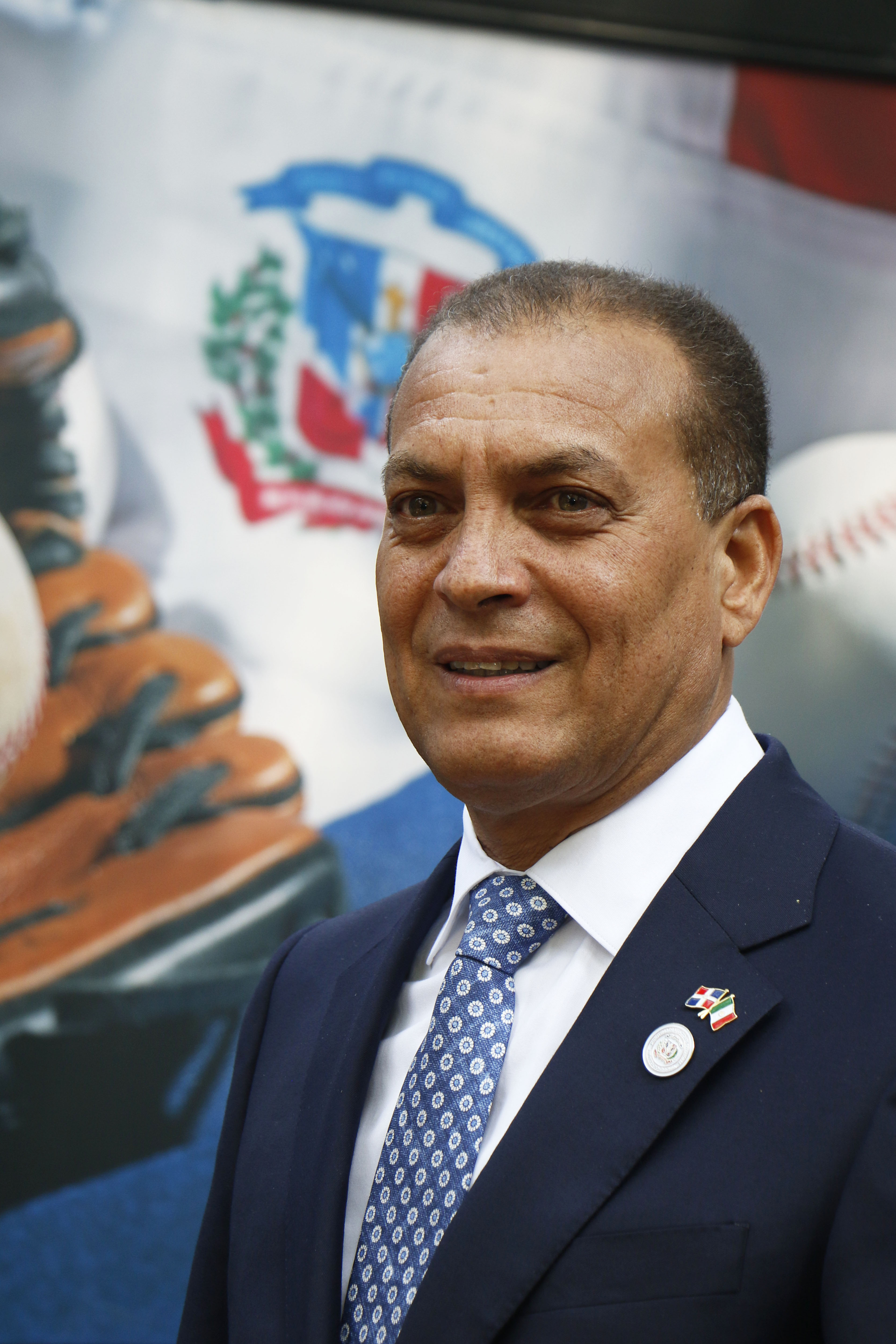
Dominican ambassador Jonny de Jesús Martínez showcasing baseball culture.

Olympic gold medalist and world champion over 400 m hurdles Félix Sánchez hails from the Dominican Republic, as does current defensive end for the San Diego Chargers (National Football League [NFL]), Luis Castillo. Castillo was the cover athlete for the Spanish language version of Madden NFL 08.

=== Holidays ===
Date	Name	
January 1	New Year's Day	Non-working day.
January 6	Catholic day of the Epiphany	Movable.
January 21	Día de la Altagracia	Non-working day. Patroness Day (Catholic).
January 26	Duarte's Day	Movable. Founding Father.
February 27	Independence Day	Non-working day. National Day.
(Variable date)	Holy Week	Working days, except Good Friday. A Catholic holiday.
May 1	International Workers' Day	Movable.
Last Sunday of May	Mother's Day	
(Variable date)	Catholic Corpus Christi	Non-working day. A Thursday in May or June (60 days after Easter Sunday).
August 16	Restoration Day	Non-working day.
September 24	Virgen de las Mercedes	Non-working day. A Patroness Day (Catholic)
November 6	Constitution Day	Movable.
December 25	Christmas	Non-working days.

Notes:

- Non-working holidays are not moved to another day.
- If a movable holiday falls on Saturday, Sunday or Monday then it is not moved to another day. If it falls on Tuesday or Wednesday, the holiday is moved to the previous Monday. If it falls on Thursday or Friday, the holiday is moved to the next Monday.

== Notable people ==
- List of people from the Dominican Republic

== See also ==
- Dominican American
- Dominican-Puerto Rican
- List of Dominican Americans
- Dominicans in Spain
- Culture of the Dominican Republic
- Demographics of the Dominican Republic
- History of the Dominican Republic
- Mixed Dominicans
- White Dominicans
- Afro-Dominicans
- Criollo people
- Hispanics

== Sources ==
- The Mulatto Republic: Class, Race, and Dominican National Identity. April J. Mayes. Gainesville: University Press of Florida, 2014. ISBN 978-0-8130-4919-9
