= Dominicans in Spain =

People from the Dominican Republic that live in Spain

Dominicans in Spain Dominicanos en España
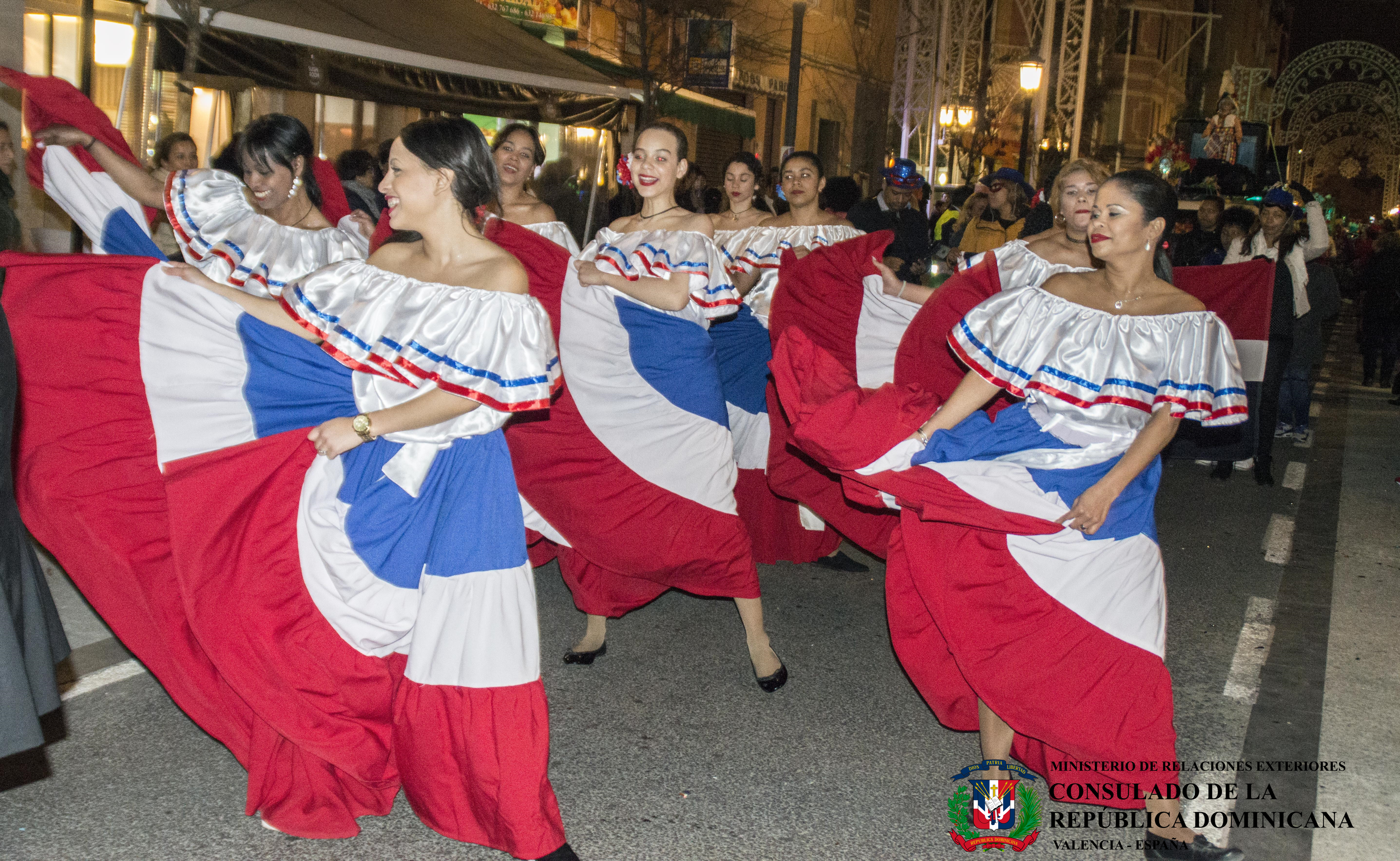
- Dominicans in Spain dance in parade

Total population
- 250,000 (2024) 190,190 (2021) - 173,531 / 71,826 (2018) (Note: 173,531 is the size of the population in Spain born in the Dominican Republic (including those with Spanish citizenship). 71,826 is the size of the foreign population in Spain with Dominican citizenship (thus, with no Spanish citizenship).)

Languages
- Spanish

Religion
- Catholicism · Protestantism

Related ethnic groups
- People of the Dominican Republic

Dominicans in Spain from the Dominican Republic make up about 1.66% of all foreigners in Spain, this includes immigrants and people of Dominican descent born in Spain. The first country of destination for Dominicans in Europe is Spain, and it is the country with the most Dominican migrants outside of the United States.

== History ==
Spain is the primary country for Dominicans immigrating to Europe. A first group traveled to pursue university studies, after they were awarded grants by the government of Juan Bosch. After the Dominican Civil War of 1965, a second exodus broke and nearly 2,000 Dominicans decided to reside in the "motherland".

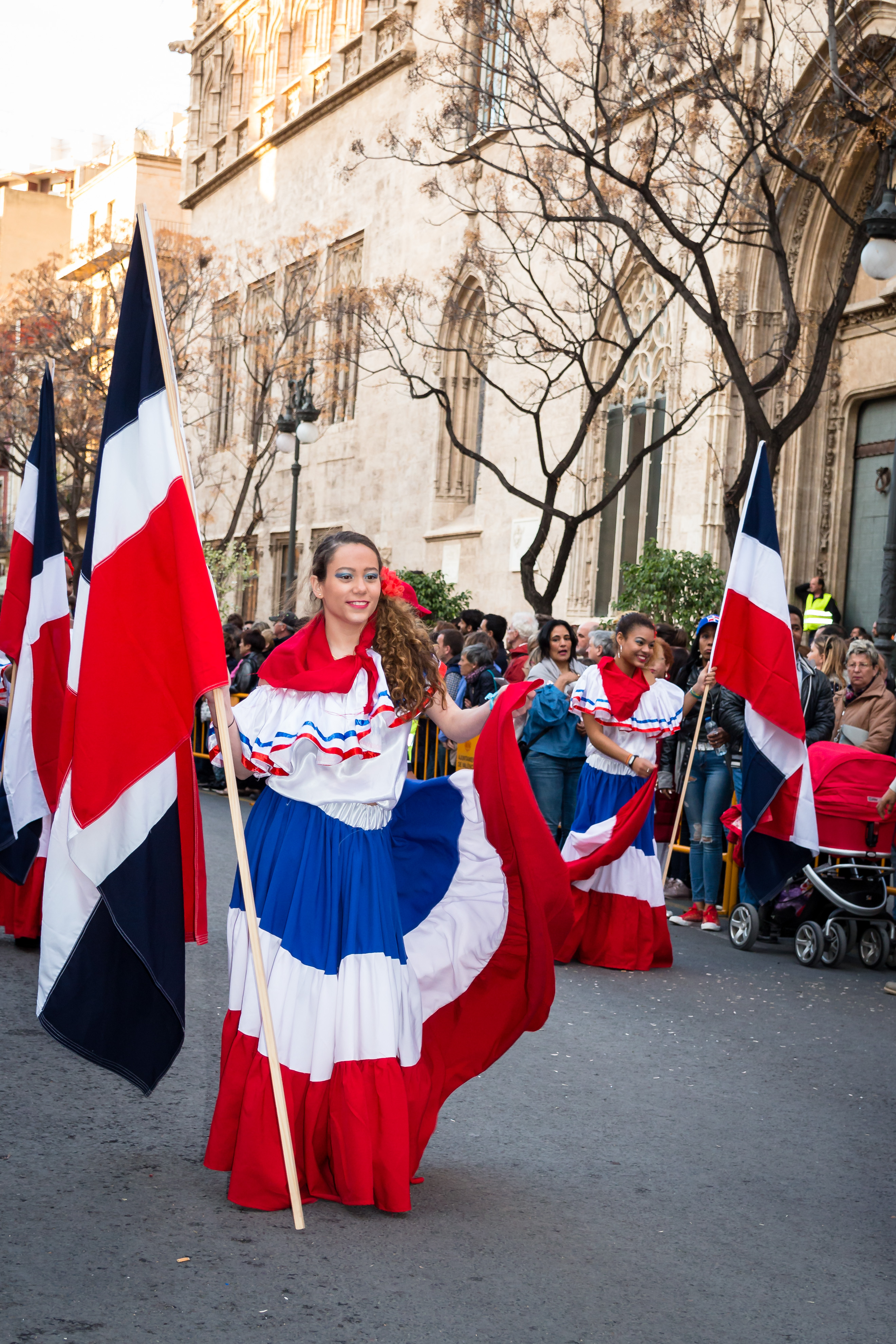
Dominicans in Spain dance in culture parade of Valencia.

== Communities ==
Dominicans are the eleventh largest immigrant group in Spain, and fifth largest from Latin America. The Autonomous communities with the largest numbers of Dominicans concentrated in Community of Madrid (123,858) and Catalonia (25,407), smaller numbers are present in Castile and León, Castilla–La Mancha, Andalusia, and Valencian. More specifically, in cities such as Madrid and Barcelona. Nearly 70% of Dominicans in Spain are in the Madrid area. In Madrid, neighborhoods like Aravaca, Cuatro Caminos, Villaverde, and Legazpi have high concentrations of Dominicans. 105,297 Dominican immigrants in Spain are female and 72,854 are male.

== Dominican-Spanish relations ==
Throughout the years, both nations have signed numerous bilateral agreements such as a Treaty of Recognition, Peace, Friendships, Commerce, Navigation and Extradition (1855); Agreement on Literary, Artistic and Scientific Property (1930); Agreement on Hispanic-Dominican Emigration (1956); Agreement on Dual-Nationality (1968); Air Transportation Agreement (1968); Agreement on Economic Cooperation (1973); Extradition and Judicial Assistance Treaty (1981); Agreement on Scientific and Technical Cooperation (1988); Agreement on Cultural and Educational Cooperation (1988); Agreement on Reciprocal Protection and Promotion of Investments (1996); Agreement on the Regulation of Migrant Laborers (2001); Social Security Agreement (2004) and an Agreement on the Avoidance of Double-Taxation (2014).

- Dominican Republic has an embassy in Madrid and consulates-general in Barcelona and Santa Cruz de Tenerife and consulates in Seville and Valencia.
- Spain has an embassy in Santo Domingo.

== Gallery of Dominican people in Spain ==
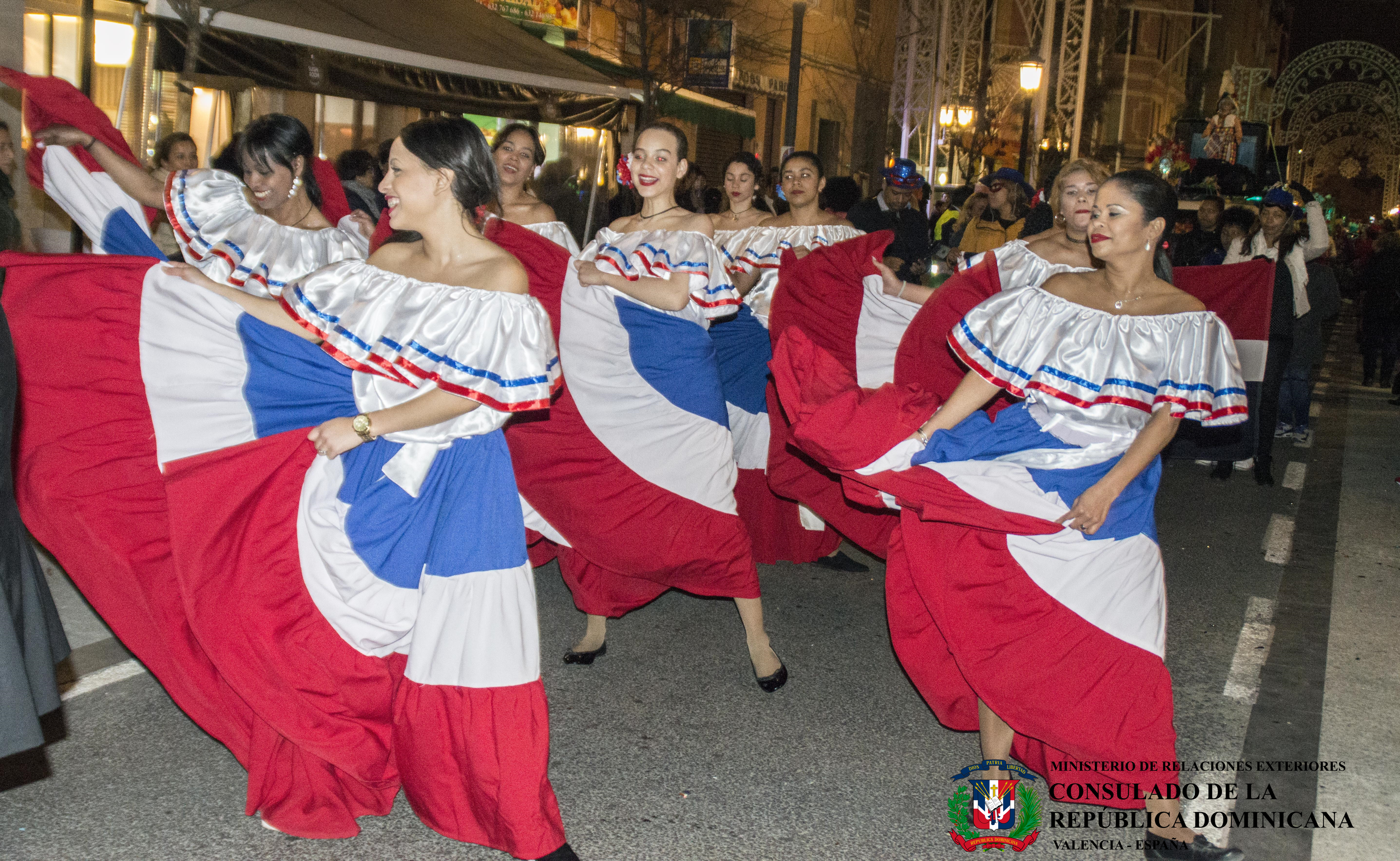

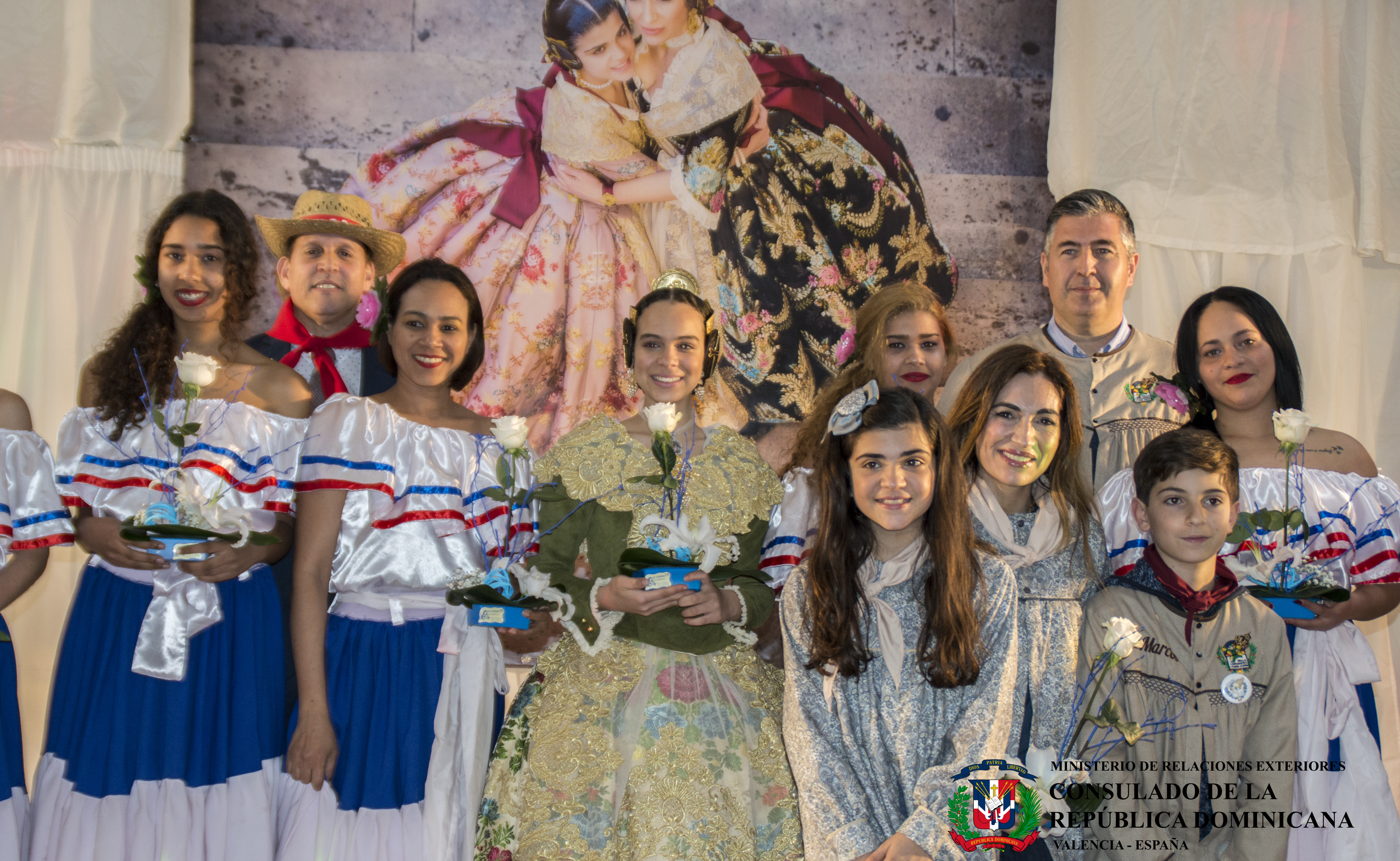

== See also ==
- Dominican Republic–Spain relations
- History of the Dominican Republic
- Captaincy General of Santo Domingo
- Immigration to Spain
- People of the Dominican Republic
- History of the Dominican Republic
