= Dominican–Spanish Treaty (1855) =

1855 treaty between the Dominican Republic and the Kingdom of Spain

Tratado de Reconocimiento, Paz, Amistad, Comercio y Navegación
- Queen Isabella II of Spain, from 1830 to 1868
- Type: Diplomatic recognition and Trade agreement
- Signed: February 8, 1855
- Location: Santo Domingo, Dominican Republic
- Effective: 1855
- Parties: Dominican Republic; Kingdom of Spain
- Language: Spanish

The Dominican–Spanish Treaty (1855) (Spanish: Tratado Dominico-Español de 1855) was an international treaty between the Dominican Republic and the Kingdom of Spain. This treaty, signed on February 8, 1855, marked Spain's formal recognition of the independent nation, which had finally declared its sovereignty in 1844.

== Bibliography ==
- Archivo Histórico Nacional (España). Papeles de Santo Domingo. Madrid: Dirección General de Bellas Artes y Archivos, 1985.
- Balcácer, Juan Daniel y Manuel A. García Arévalo. La independencia dominicana. Madrid: Editorial Mapfre, 1992.
- Castel, Jorge. El restablecimiento de las relaciones entre España y las repúblicas hispanoamericanas (1836-1894). Madrid: Cuadernos de las relaciones internacionales y política exterior de España, 1955.
- Escolano Giménez, Luis Alfonso. “El comienzo de las relaciones diplomáticas entre España y la República Dominicana en 1855”. Revista Complutense de Historia de América 37 (2011): 277-299. DOI: 10.5209/revrcha. 2011.v37.12. -- “El comienzo de la rivalidad internacional y de la injerencia española en la República Dominicana (1855-1856)”. Revista de Indias 75, n.º 265 (2015): 711-742. DOI: 10.3989/revindias.2015.022.
- García, José Gabriel. Compendio de la historia de Santo Domingo. 4.ª ed. SantoDomingo: ¡Ahora!, 1968.
- González Calleja, Eduardo y Antonio Fontecha Pedraza. Una cuestión de honor. La polémica sobre la anexión de Santo Domingo vista desde España (1861-1865). Santo Domingo: Fundación García Arévalo, 2005.
- Hauch, Charles Christian. La República Dominicana y sus relaciones exteriores 1844-1882. Santo Domingo: Sociedad Dominicana de Bibliófilos, 1996.
- Inarejos Muñoz, Juan Antonio. Intervenciones coloniales y nacionalismo español. Lapolítica exterior de la Unión Liberal y sus vínculos con la Francia de Napoleón III (1856-1868). Madrid: Sílex, 2010.
- Jover Zamora, José María. La civilización española a mediados del siglo XIX. Madrid: Espasa-Calpe, 1992.
- Julián, Amadeo. “La situación internacional, la crisis económica nacional y la misión Mella a España en 1854”. En La sociedad dominicana durante la Primera República 1844-1861, editado por Tirso Mejía-Ricart G., 269-305. Santo Domingo: Universidad Autónoma de Santo Domingo, 1977. "Rafael María Baralt. Su vida, obras y servicios prestados a la República Dominicana”. Clío 81, n.º 183 (enero-junio 2012): 43-125.
- Pérez, Carlos Federico. Historia diplomática de Santo Domingo (1492-1861). Santo Domingo: Universidad Nacional Pedro Henríquez Ureña, 1973.
- Perkins, Dexter. La cuestión de Santo Domingo 1849-1865. Santo Domingo: Sociedad Dominicana de Bibliófilos, 1991 (facsímil de la 1.ª ed. en español. Ciudad Trujillo, República Dominicana: [Logia Cuna de América], 1955).
- Pinto Tortosa, Antonio. Santo Domingo: una colonia en la encrucijada 1790-1820. Madrid: Foro para el Estudio de la Historia Militar de España, 2017.
- Robles Muñoz, Cristóbal. Paz en Santo Domingo (1854-1865). El fracaso de la anexión a España. Madrid: Consejo Superior de Investigaciones Científicas, 1987.
- Welles, Sumner. La viña de Naboth. La República Dominicana 1844-1924. 4.ª ed. Santo Domingo: Taller, 1981.
