= April Mayes =

American historian

April J. Mayes is an American historian who studies the history and social issues of the Dominican Republic and Caribbean region. She is the Warren Finney Day Professor of History at Pomona College in Claremont, California.

== Early life and education ==
Mayes grew up in the city of Pomona, California. She did her undergraduate studies at Pomona College, where she was involved with community engagement work. Shen then earned her doctorate at the University of Michigan.

== Career ==
Mayes returned to Pomona and began teaching there in 2006. She was promoted to an endowed chair in 2024.
