= Anolis ravifaux =

Scientific classification
- Kingdom: Animalia
- Phylum: Chordata
- Class: Reptilia
- Order: Squamata
- Suborder: Iguania
- Family: Dactyloidae
- Genus: Anolis
- Species: A. ravifaux

Binomial name
- Anolis ravifaux Schwartz & Henderson, 1982

Species of lizard

Anolis ravifaux, the Saona stout anole, is a species of lizard in the family Dactyloidae. Males grow to 59 mm (2.3 in) and females to 44 mm (1.7 in) in snout–vent length. Males have dirty-white dewlaps, occasionally with a yellow hue. It is endemic to the far southeast Dominican Republic, including Saona Island and perhaps Catalina Island.

== Taxonomy ==
Specimens of Anolis ravifaux were historically considered to represent Anolis cybotes. Anolis ravifaux was formally described in 1982 as a subspecies of Anolis cybotes, Anolis cybotes rauifaux. The description was based on a specimen from Mano Juan in the Saona Island in the Dominican Republic. It continued to be treated as a subspecies or entirely synonymized with cybotes until 2019, when it was raised to full species status. The specific epithet is derived from the Latin words meaning "gray-throat", referring to the species' dull gray dewlap. It has the common name Saona stout anole.

A. ravifaux is most closely related to a clade formed by A. doris, armouri, and shrevei. The extremely large genus Anolis is sometimes split into several smaller genera; under this arrangement, Anolis ravifaux is placed in the genus Audantia, a group of more than a dozen species endemic to Hispaniola.

== Description ==
Males of the species grow to a snout–vent length of 59 mm (2.3 in) and females to 44 mm (1.7 in). Males have dirty-white dewlaps, occasionally with a yellow hue. There are no dark stripes on the throat.

== Distribution and ecology ==
Anolis ravifaux is endemic to the Dominican Republic, a Caribbean country that occupies the eastern portion of the island of Hispaniola, which it shares with Haiti. A. ravifaux is only found in the far southeast of the island, including Saona Island, from which it was described. Records from Catalina Island are unconfirmed.
