= Geology of the Dominican Republic =

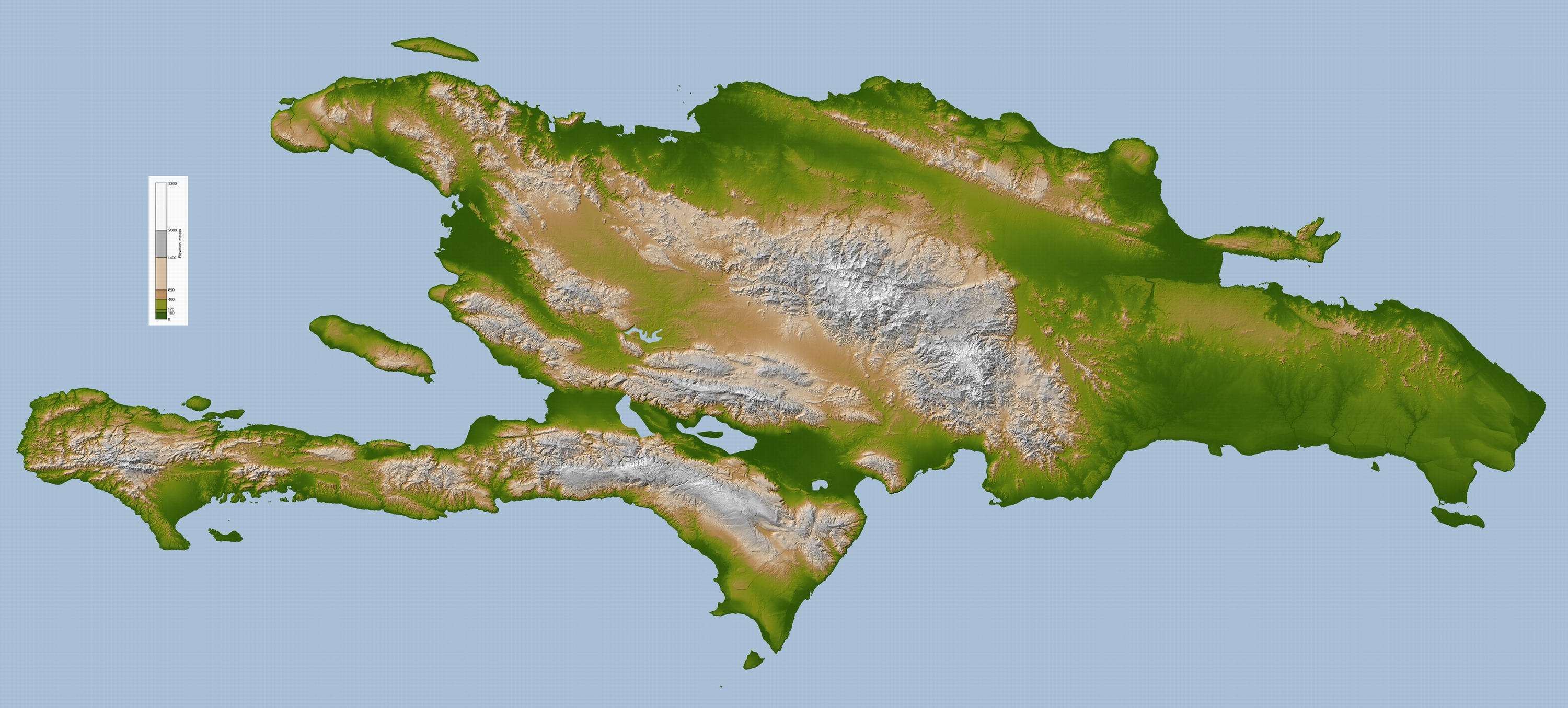
The island of Hispaniola

The geology of the Dominican Republic is part of the broader geology of Hispaniola with rocks formed from multiple island arcs, colliding with North America.

== Geologic history, stratigraphy and tectonics ==
The oldest rocks on the island formed beginning in the early Cretaceous through island arc plutonism. Before the Aptian, the island was uplifted, particularly in the east, likely due to the collision of a volcanic island arc. In total, Hispaniola is formed from 11 distinct small island arcs. From the Albian to the Campanian, plutonism, metamorphism and volcanism began simultaneously, taking place underwater on the largely submerged landmass. In the Campanian a second arc collision took place. Picrite from the Duarte Complex in central Hispaniola has been inferred as Galapagos hotspot-type island plateau rocks.

The Cordillera Central in the middle of the island has obducted peridotite from the mid-Cretaceous on top of a mylonite and phyllonite schist shear zone in the Maimon Formation. Deformation appears in rocks north, as far as the volcanic and sedimentary Los Ranchos Formation. They are unconformably overlain by Albian-Cenomanian limestones.

=== Cenozoic (66 million years ago-present) ===
Into the Paleogene at the start of the Cenozoic, volcanism, metamorphism and plutonism continued underwater until the Eocene, still largely below water. However, by the middle Eocene, the amalgamated island arcs collided with the southern margin of the North American Plate at the Florida-Bahama Platform, leading to the formation of extensive carbonates and the end of volcanism and plutonism. The island arc rocks became exposed above the water line and began to erode as an east-west strike-slip fault emerged. From the Miocene to recent times, oblique strike-slip faults formed along the sutures between old island arcs as the island compressed against North America and oceanic plateau terranes. Nine large fault bounded mountain ranges formed.

Within the Dominican Republic, the central Cordillera Septentrional spans the strike-slip fault boundary between the North American and Caribbean plates. Faults and folds from the Paleocene to the Pliocene in marine sedimentary rocks indicate its history of uplift, beginning in Eocene pelagic carbonates. Transpression in the Miocene-Pliocene created an anticline in shallow marine carbonates.

== Natural resource geology ==
The large Pueblo Viejo oxide gold deposit formed due to gold, quartz and pyrophyllite weathering in a small basin within the Los Ranchos Formation. At its basin, the formation has conglomerate, ascending to sandstone and carbonaceous sandstone with plant fossils indicating proximity to land. Veins filled with metal due to hydrothermal emplacement.

== See also ==
- List of islands of the Dominican Republic
