= Samaná Bay =

Bay in the eastern Dominican Republic

Coordinates: 19°10′N 69°25′W

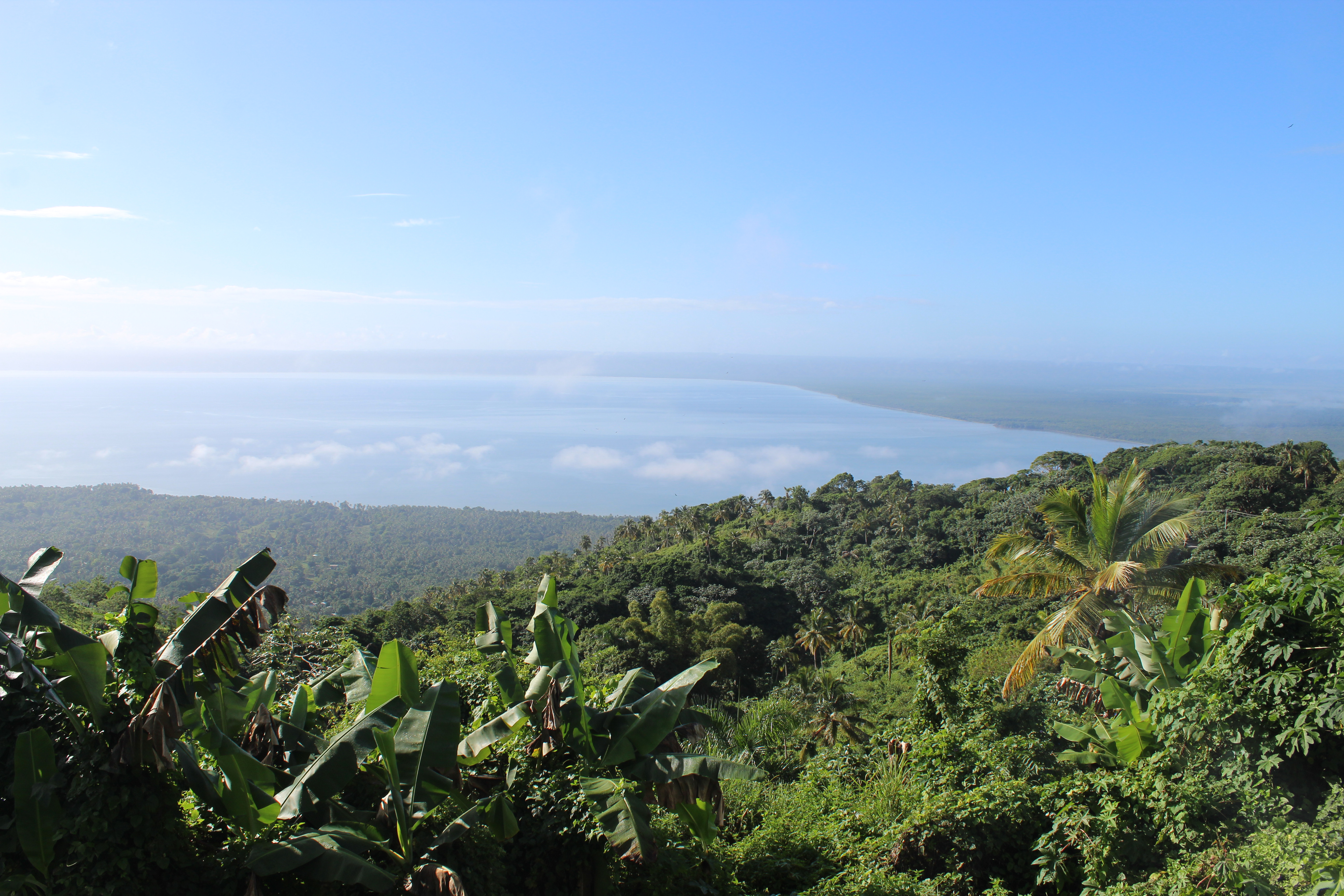
View of Samaná Bay with Samana Peninsula on the horizon.

Samaná Bay is a bay in the eastern Dominican Republic. The Yuna River flows into Samaná Bay, and it is located south of the town of Samaná and the Samaná Peninsula.

== Wildlife ==
Among its features are protected islands that serve as nesting sites for pelicans and frigatebirds, caves with Indigenous pictographs and petroglyphs, and mangrove-lined river tributaries It is a significant breeding site for the humpback whale in the Caribbean; the breeding season attracts many whale-watchers.

== Geography ==
Samaná Bay lies along the boundary between the North American Plate and the Caribbean Plate. Two named fault lines run the length of Samaná Bay. These fault lines form the western terminal of the nineteen-degree fault, that runs north of Puerto Rico and most of Hispaniola to form the northern boundary of the Caribbean Plate. As such, the area is prone to earthquakes.

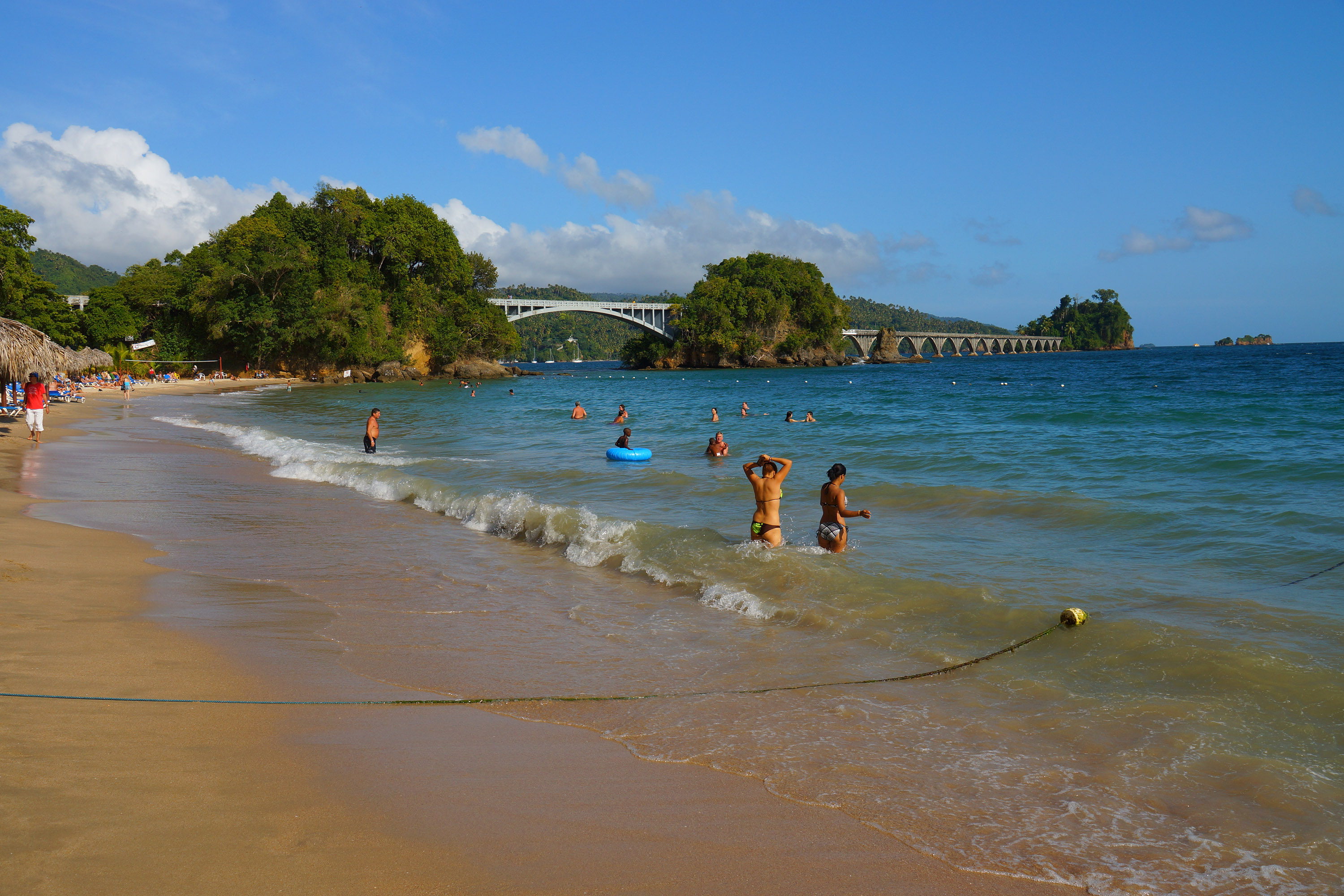

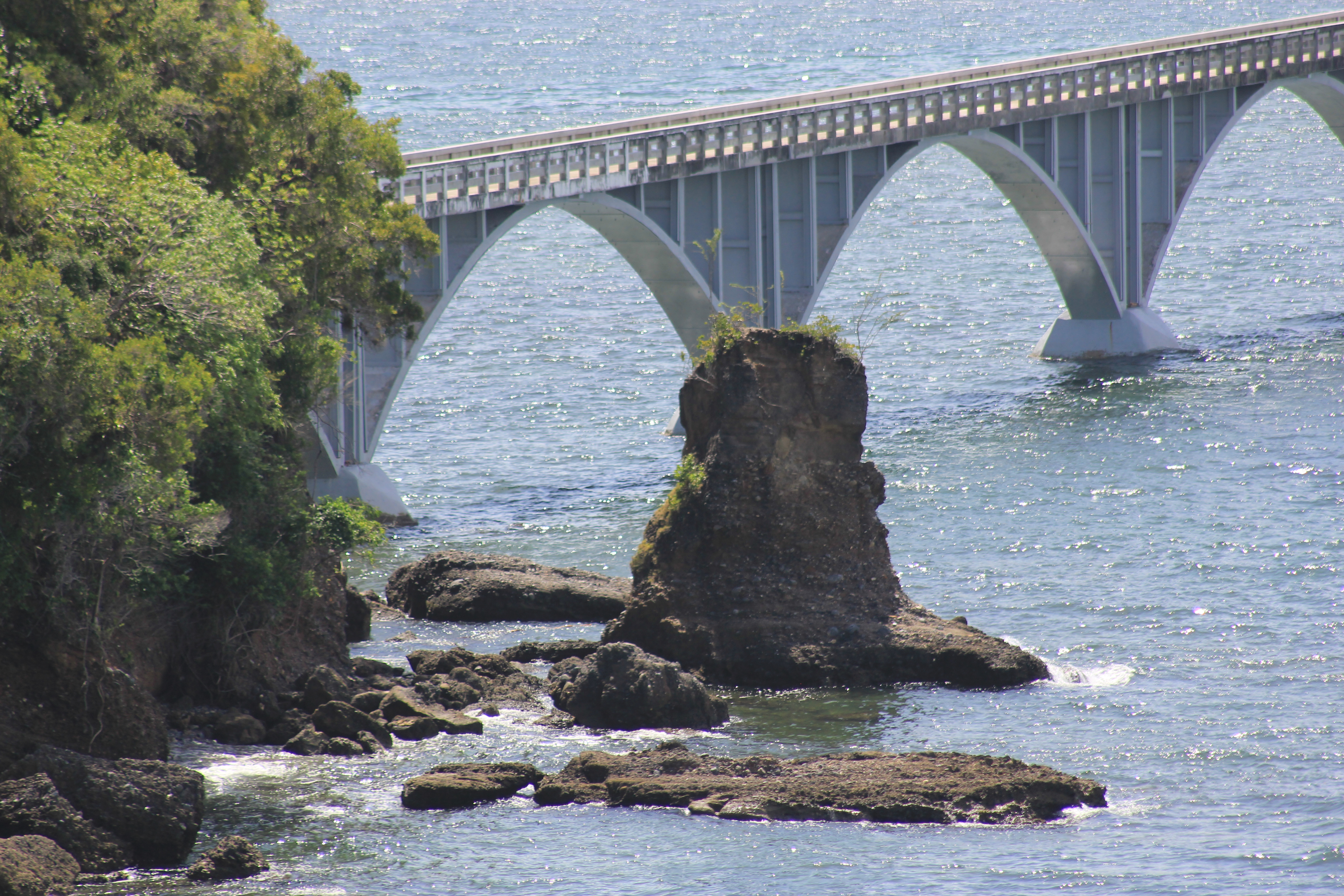

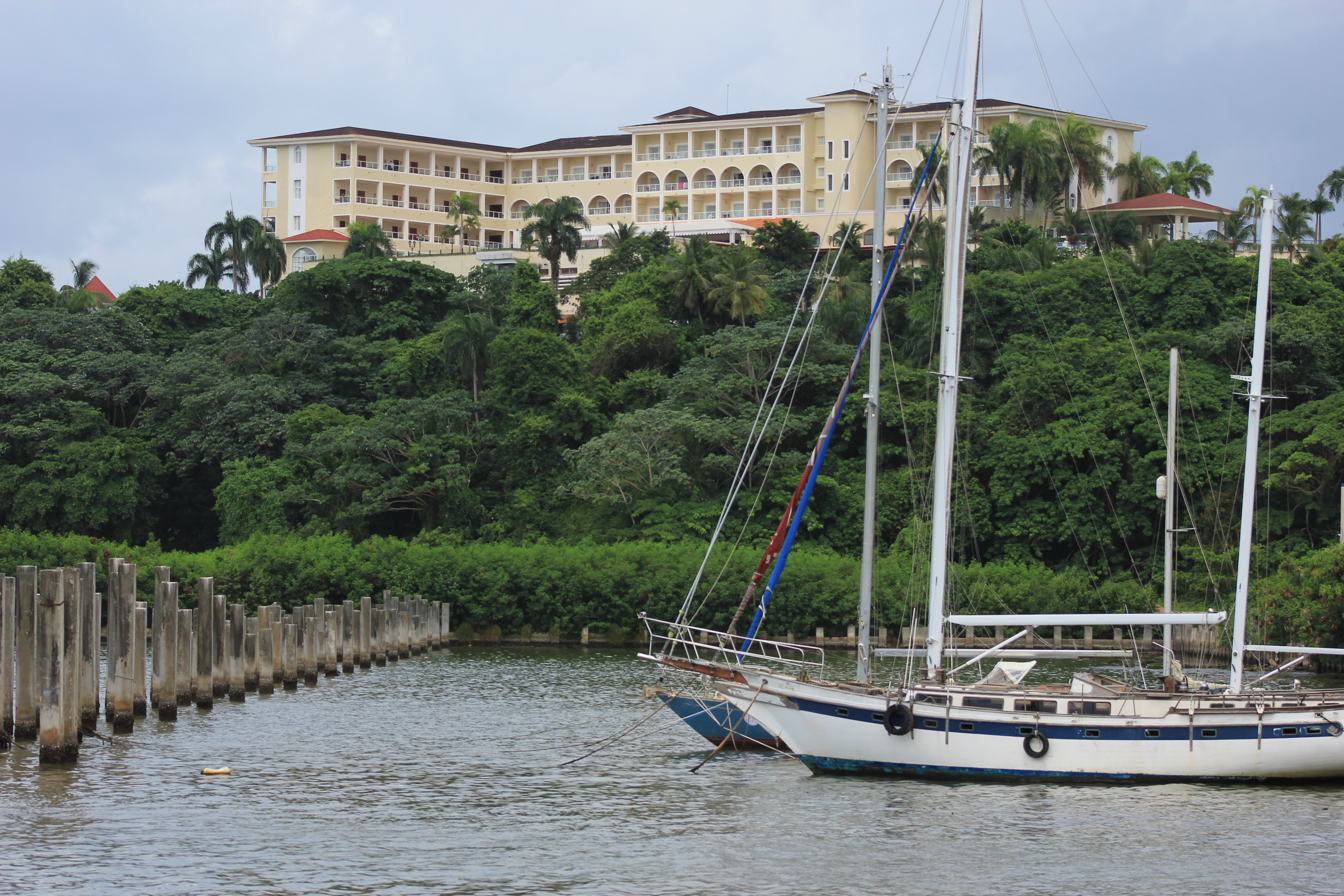

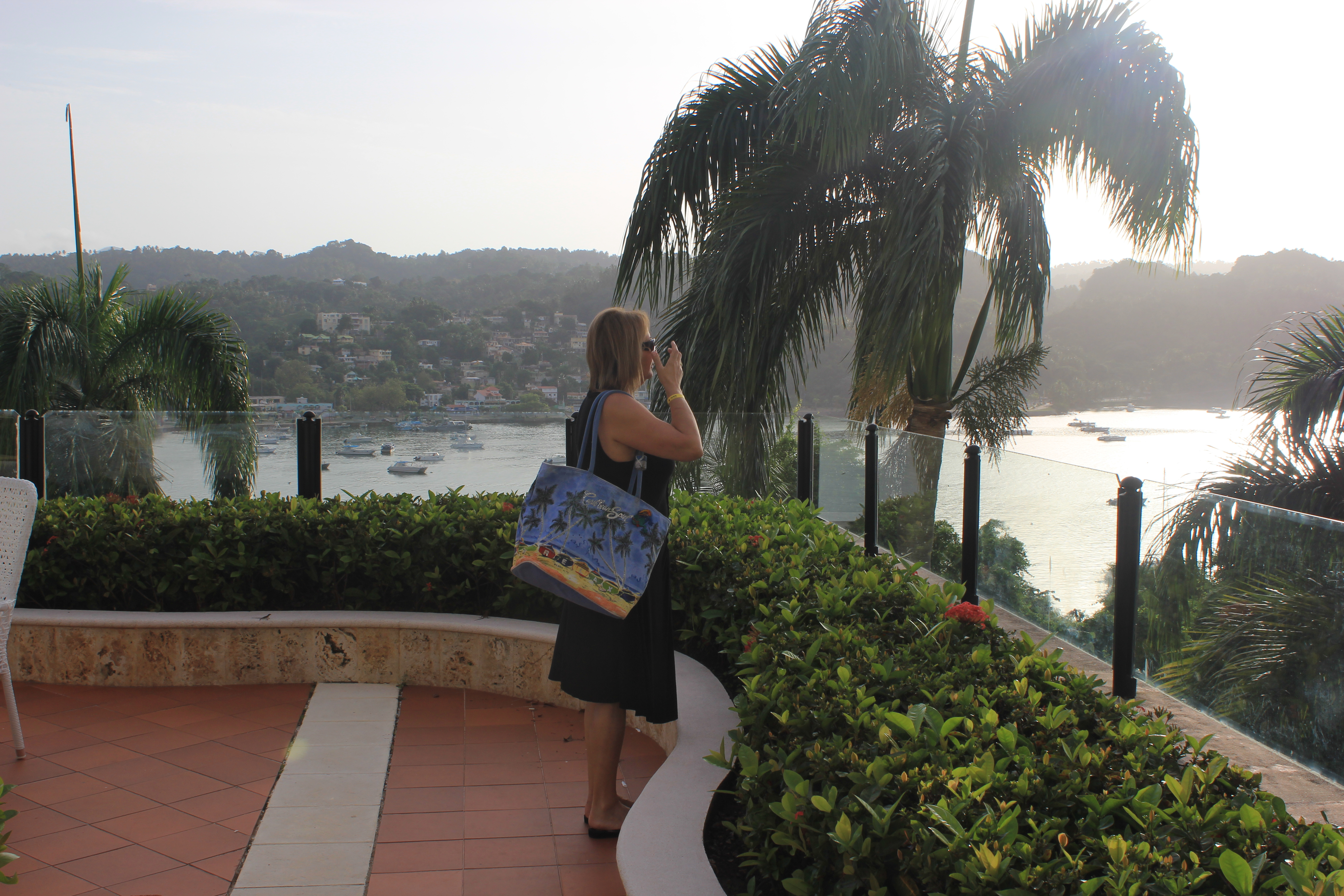

== Landmarks ==
Adjoining the bay is Los Haitises National Park, which is popular with national and international ecotourist visitors. Samaná Bay also has 4-star hotels.

Contained within Samaná Bay is the island of Cayo Levantado also known as Bacardi Island.

== History ==
The administration of US President Franklin Pierce instructed a special agent to negotiate a treaty permitting the United States to establish a naval base in Samaná Bay, resulting in an agreement in October 1854. However, British and French envoys (who opposed US military presence in the area) convinced the Dominican government to insert a stipulation that Dominican citizens be treated as white people in the United States, ending the chances of the treaty being ratified. Again, in the aftermath of the American Civil War, US Secretary of State William H. Seward formed a plan to purchase or lease Samaná Bay for the United States, which was then seeking bases for its navy in the Caribbean. However, the plan failed - partly due to hostility between Congress and President Andrew Johnson, making Congress reluctant to allocate funds for the purpose. Later efforts by the Grant Administration to purchase the bay, which soon expanded to annex all of the Dominican Republic also failed in the U.S. Senate.
