= Cayo Levantado =

Island in the Dominican Republic

Coordinates: 19°10′00″N 69°16′33″W

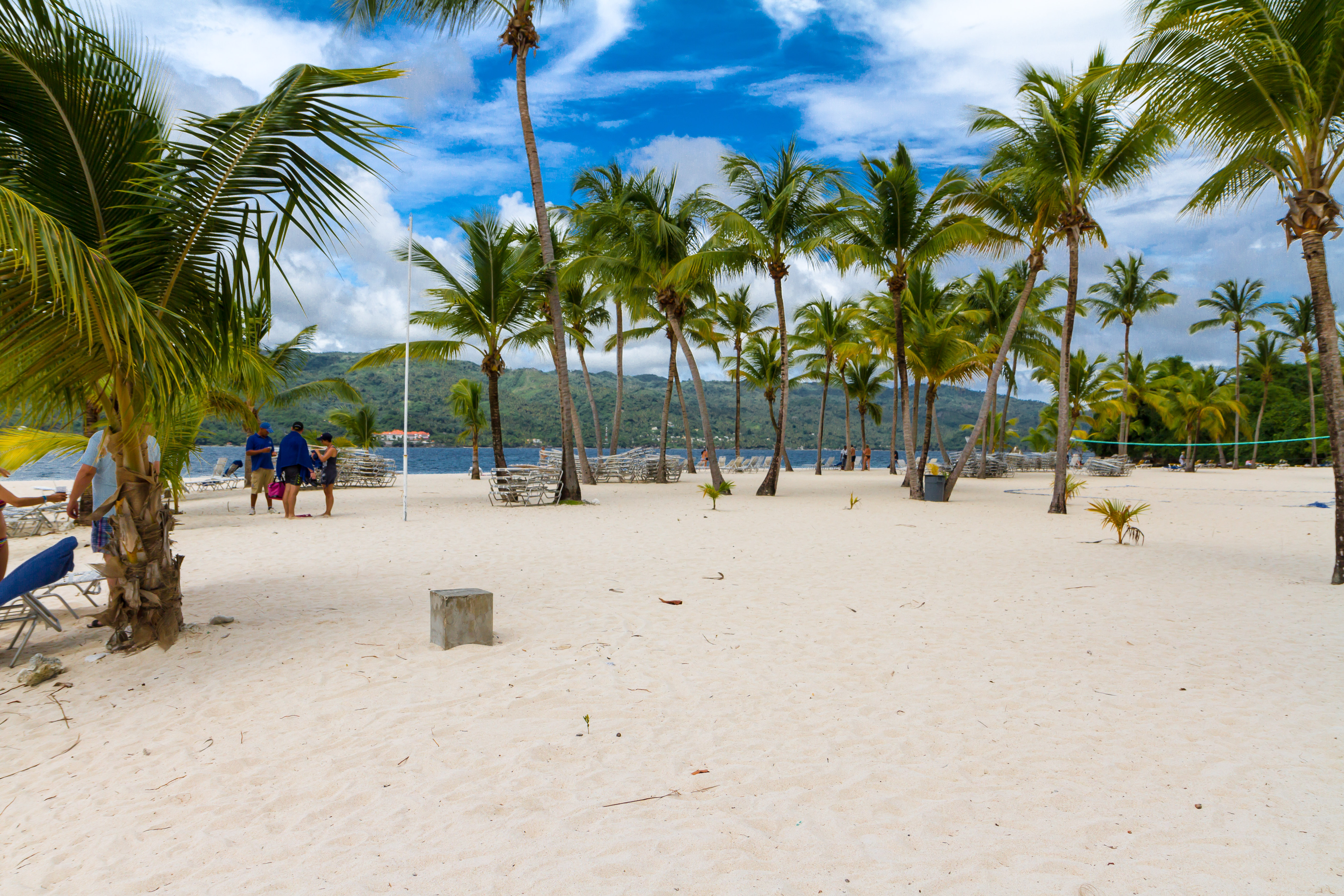
- Cayo Levantado
- Interactive map of Cayo Levantado

Geography
- Highest elevation: 85.3 ft (26 m)

Administration
- Dominican Republic
- Province: Samana

Cayo Levantado is an island in Samaná Bay, located in the Samaná Province in the eastern region of Dominican Republic. It is a well-known tourist destination in the country. The nearest airport, the Samaná El Catey International Airport is 68 kilometers away. A five-star hotel of the Grand Bahia Principe chain is located on the island.

It has picked up the nickname Bacardi Island due to its location use in advertisements for the white rum spirit manufacturer Bacardi.

== Geography ==
The highest point of the island is 26 meters above sea level. It covers 0.5 km from north to south and 0.9 km from east to west. Tropical rainforest climate prevails in the area. The annual average temperature in the area is 24 °C. The warmest month is September, when the average temperature is 26 °C, and the coldest is January, with 22 °C. The average annual rainfall is 1,927 millimeters. The wettest month is May, with an average rainfall of 281 mm, and the driest month is February, with 59 mm of rainfall.

== Gallery ==
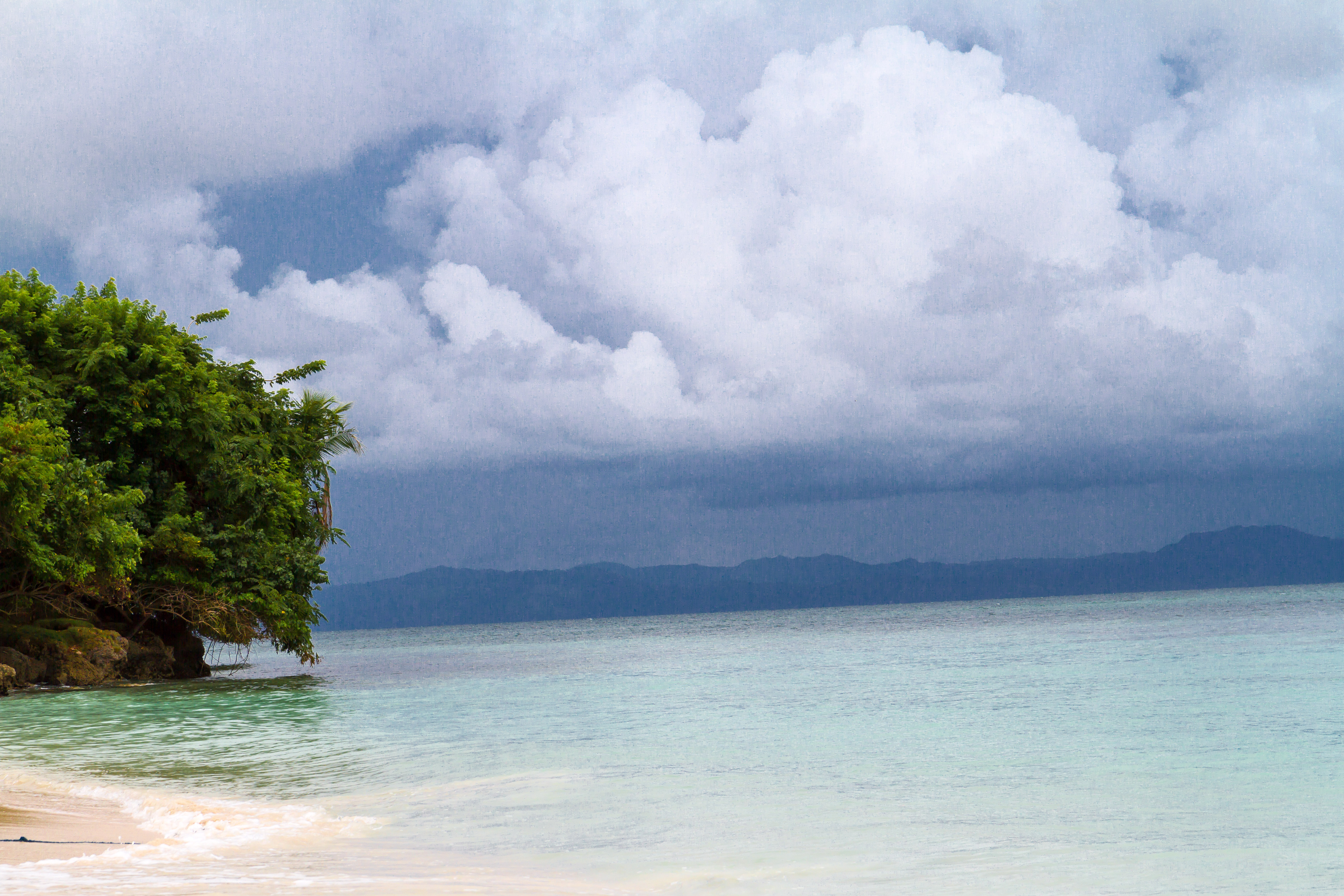

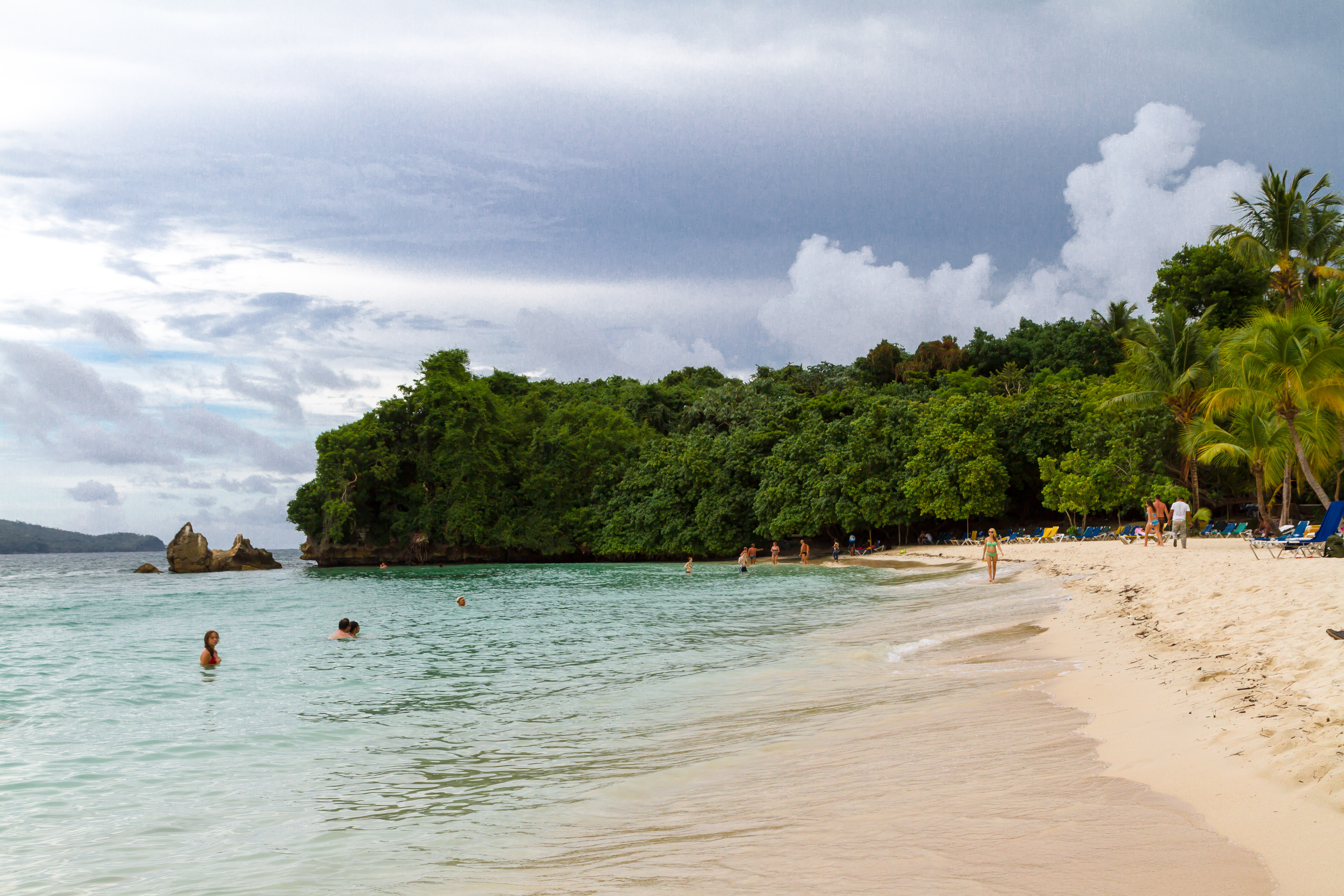

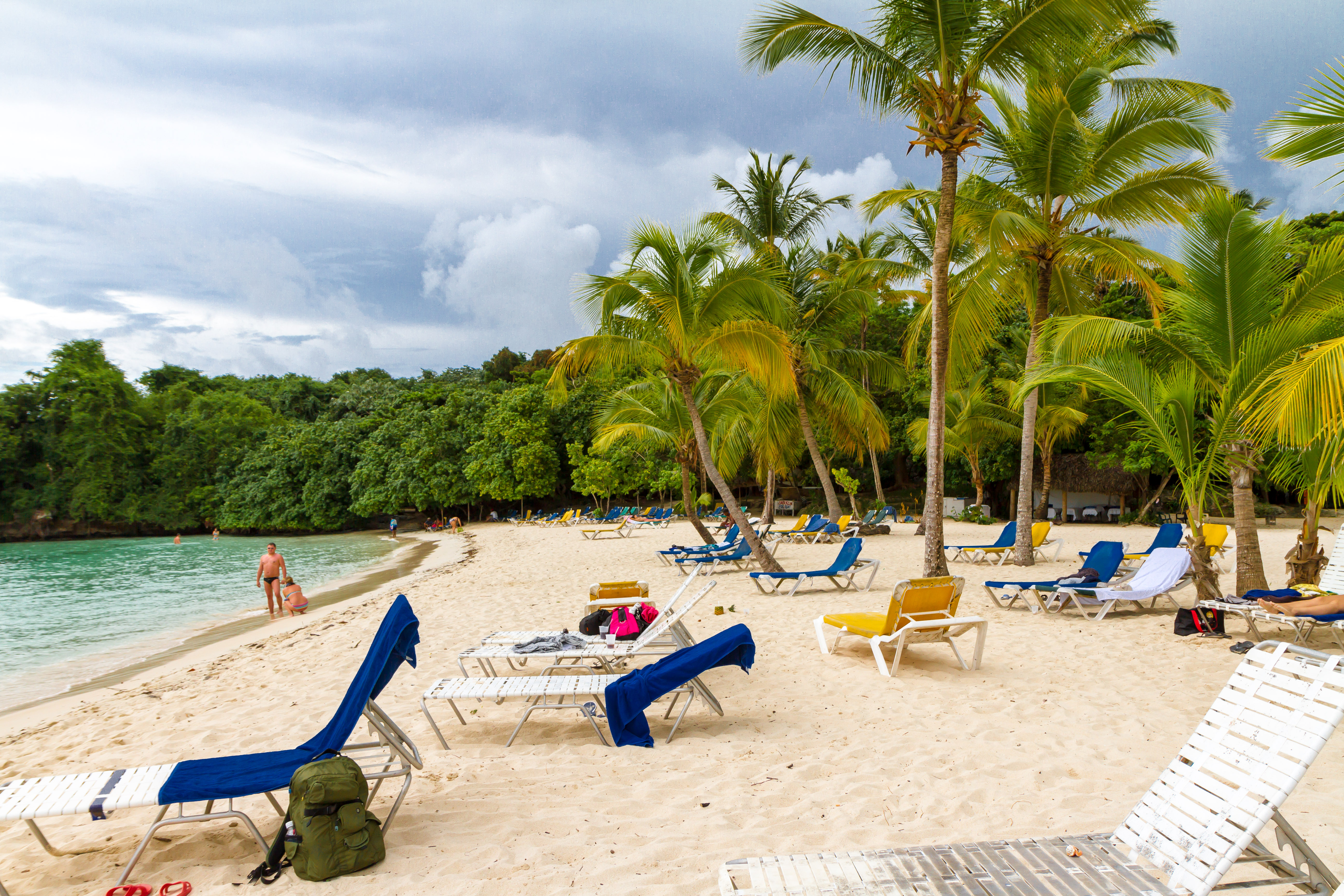

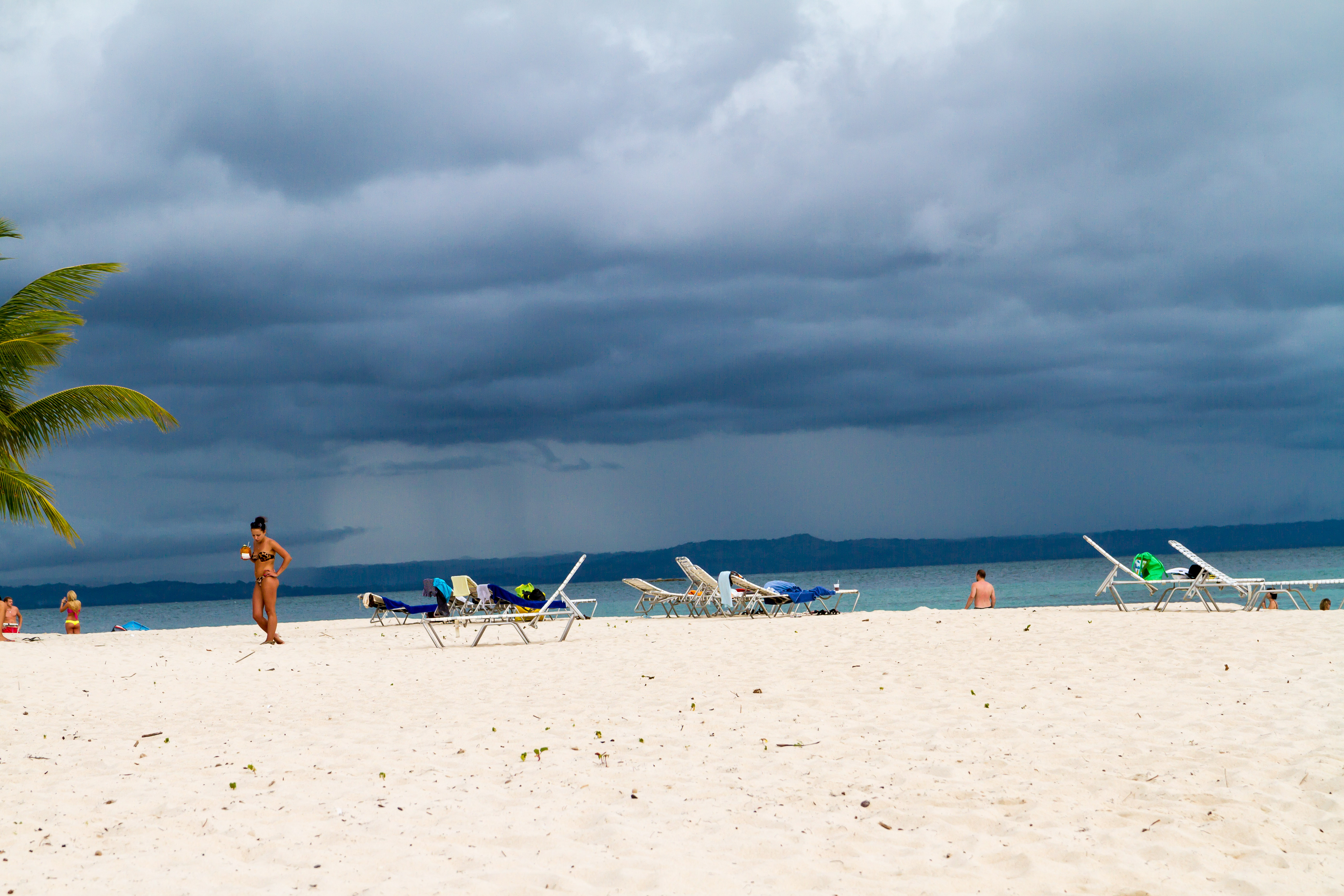

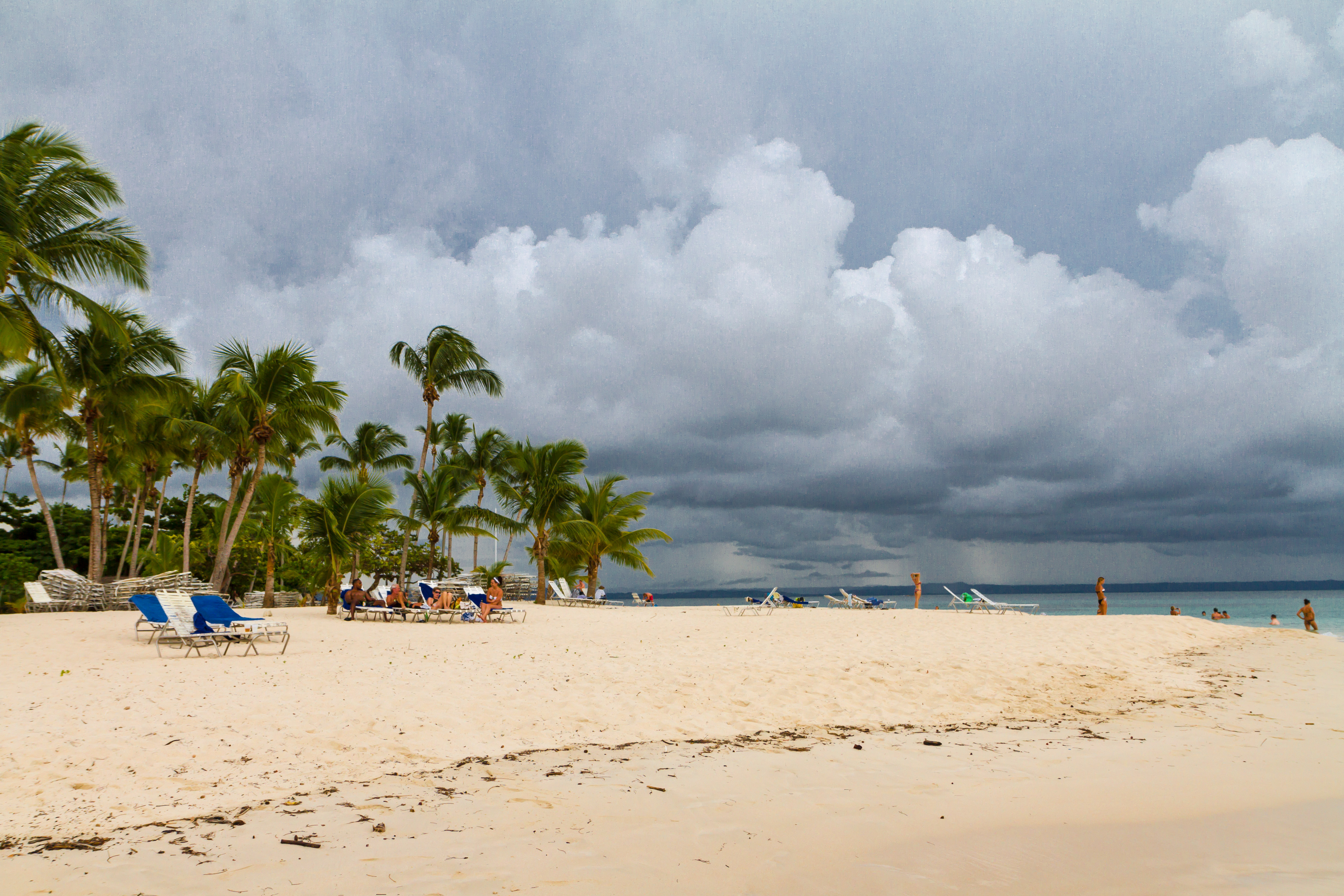

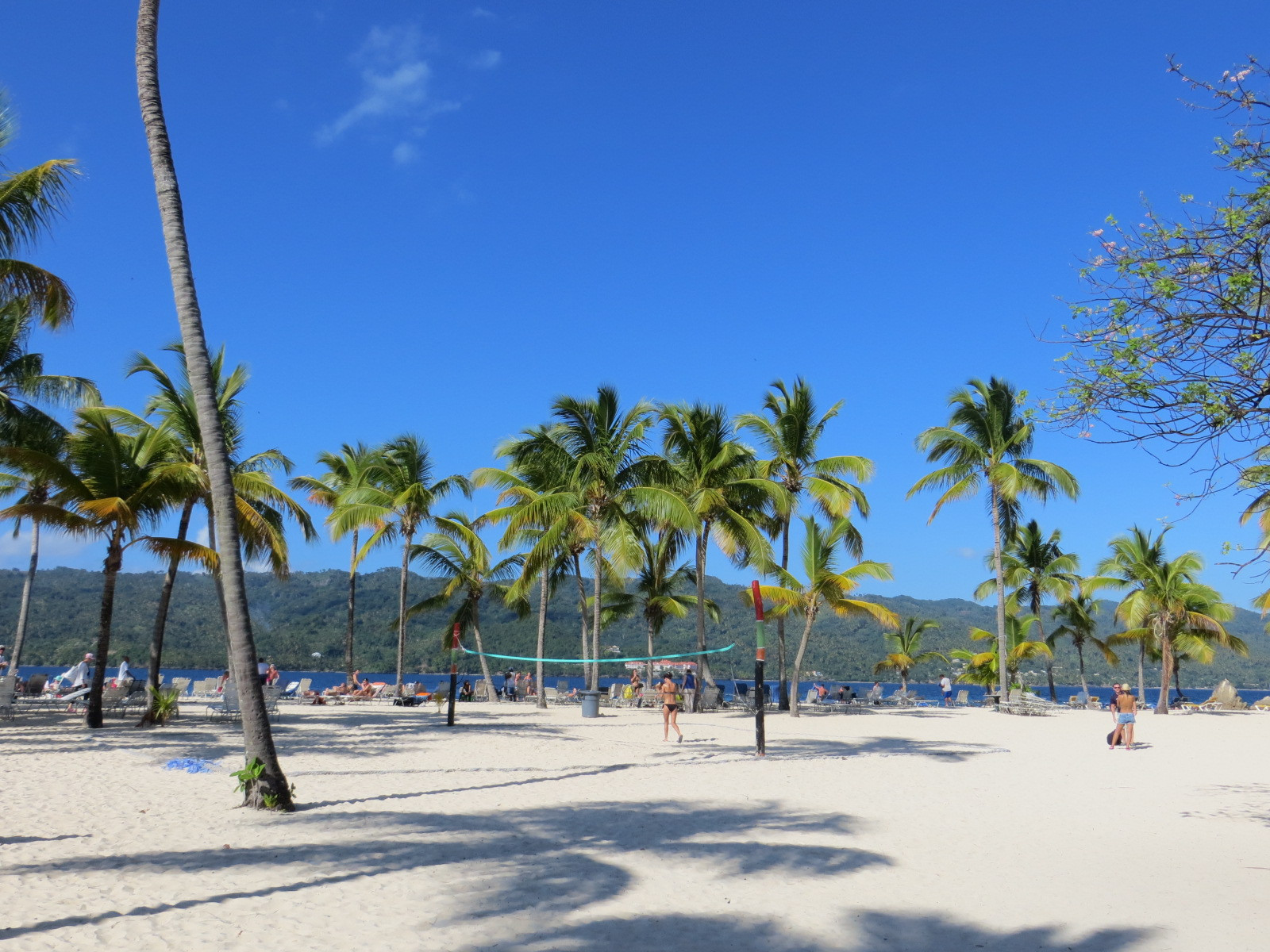

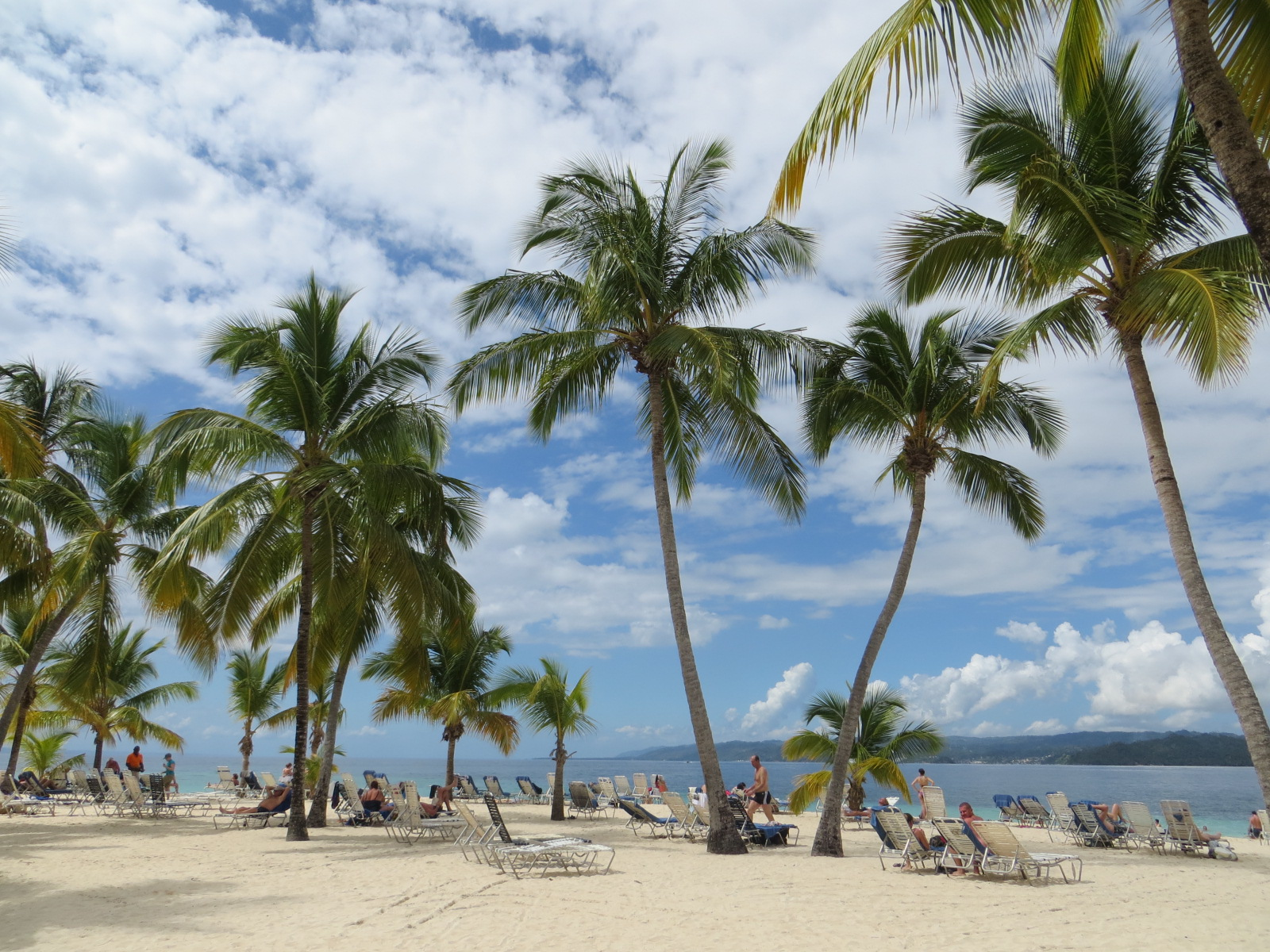

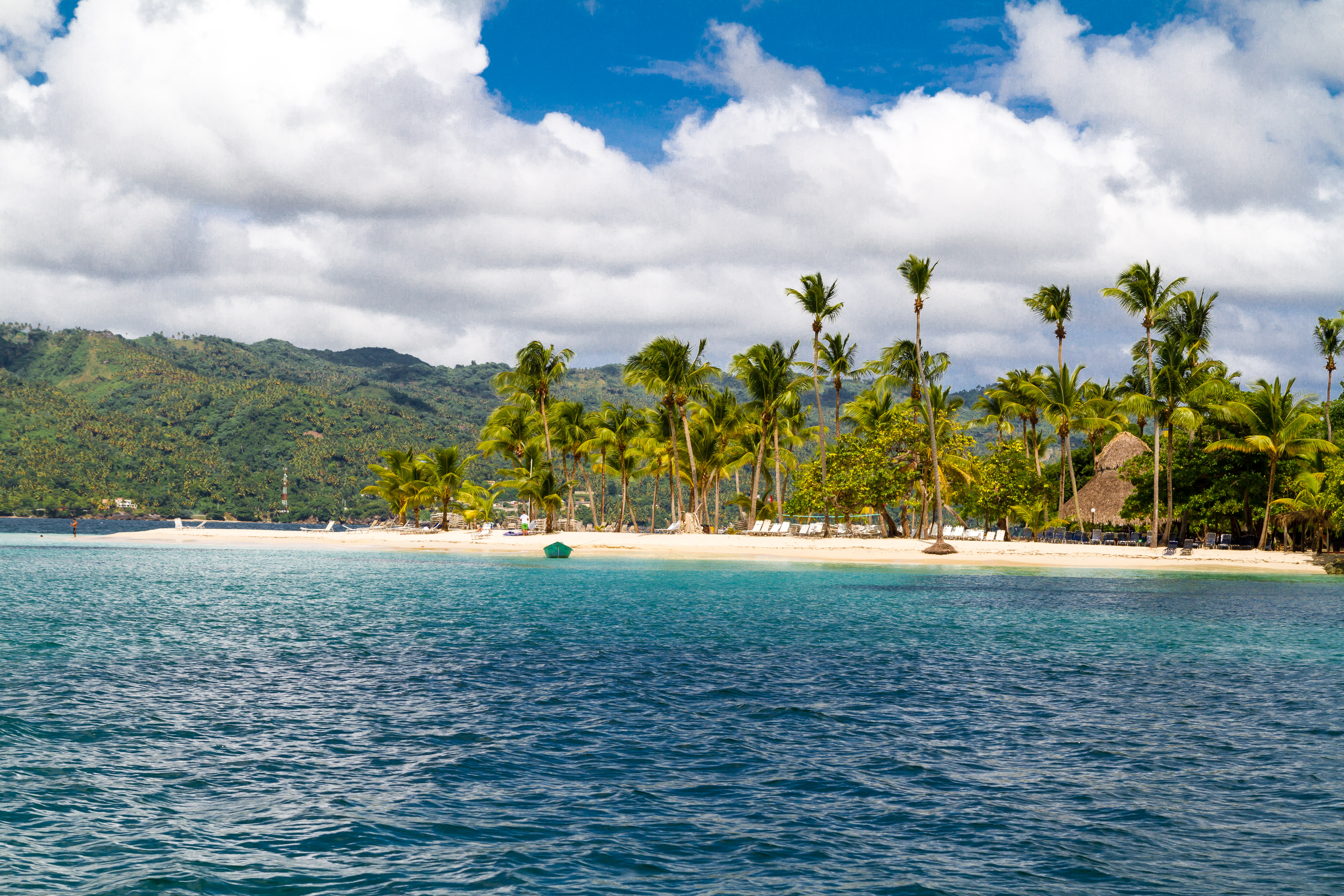

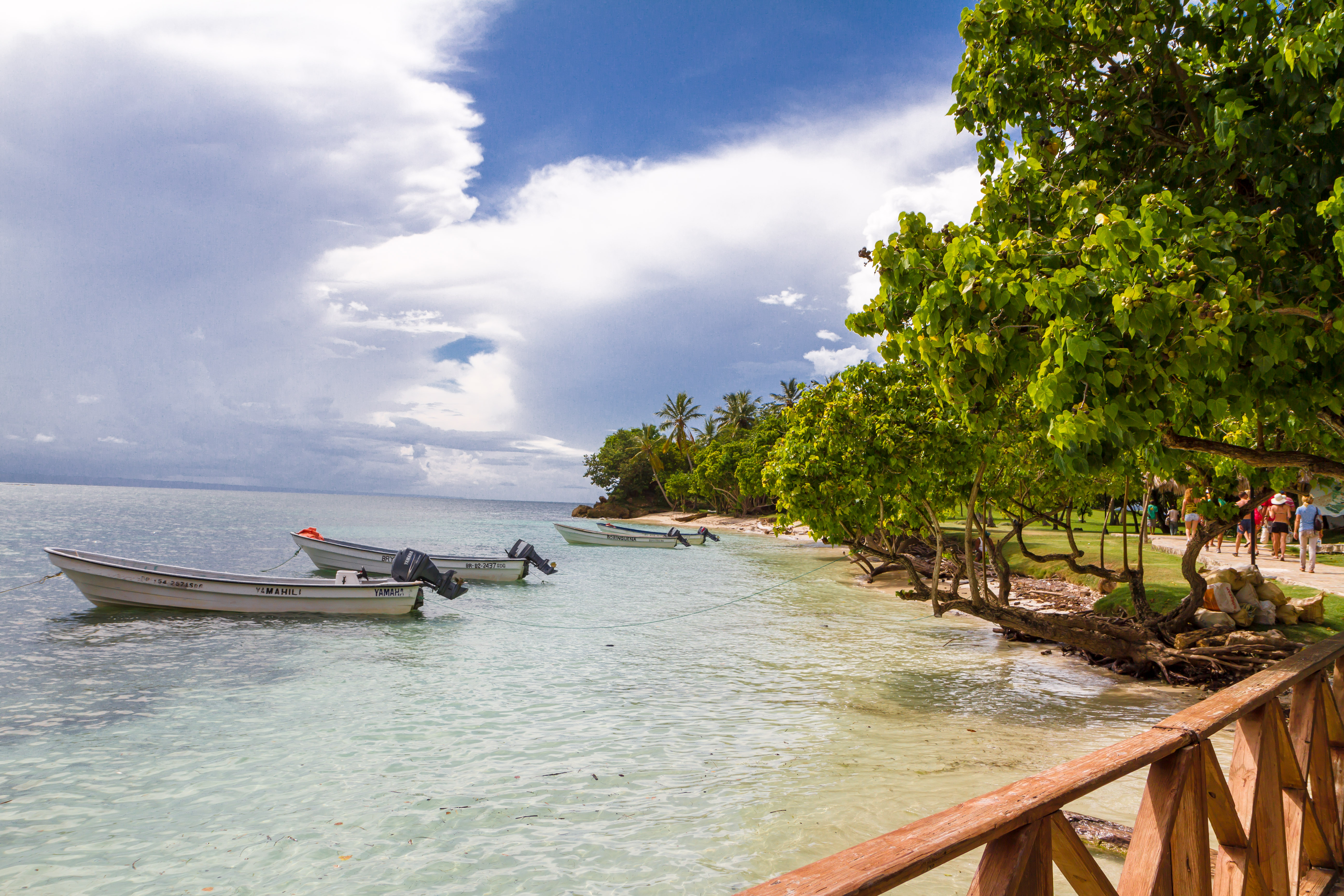

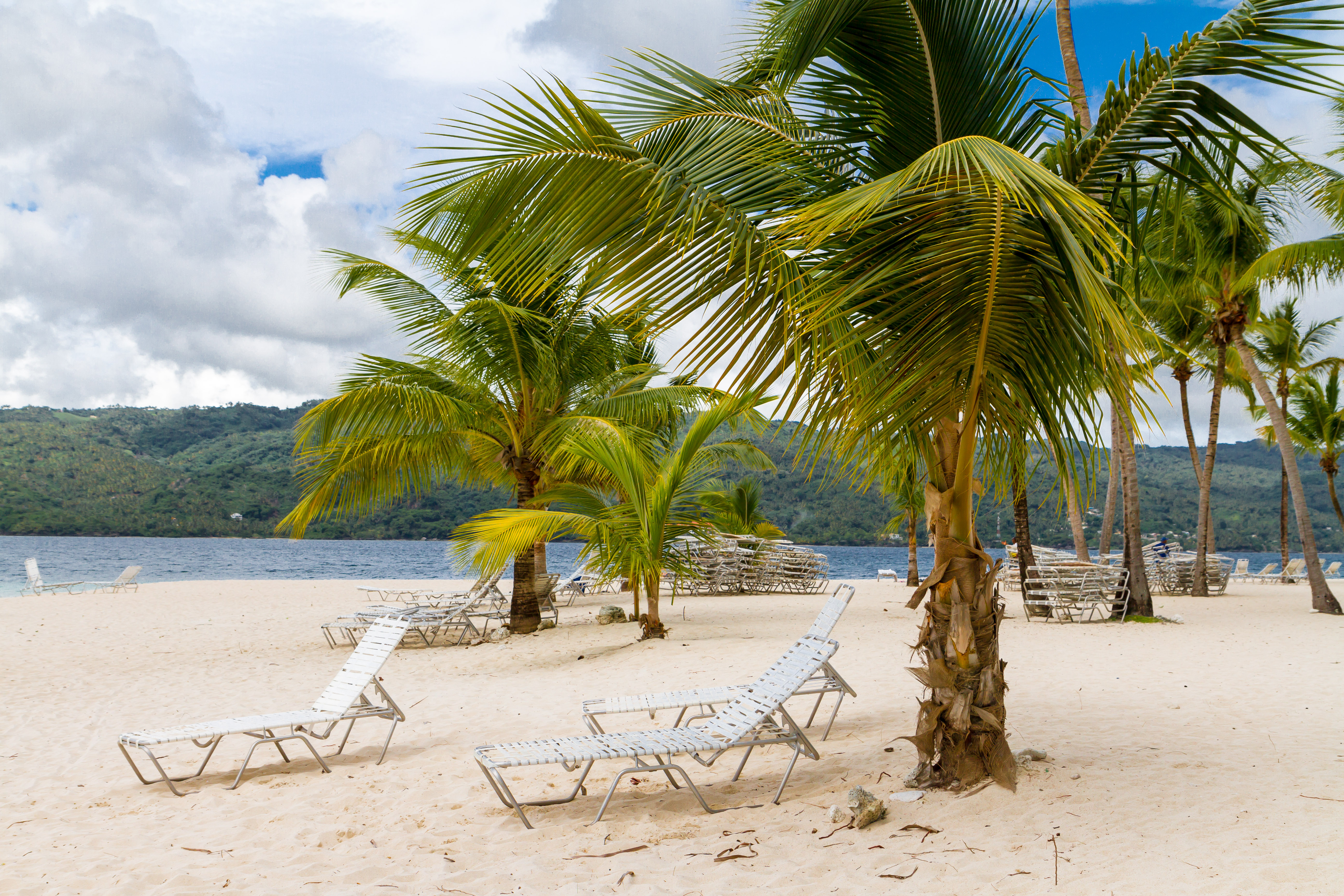

== See also ==
- Samana Province
- Geography of the Dominican Republic
- List of islands of the Dominican Republic
