= List of islands of the Dominican Republic =

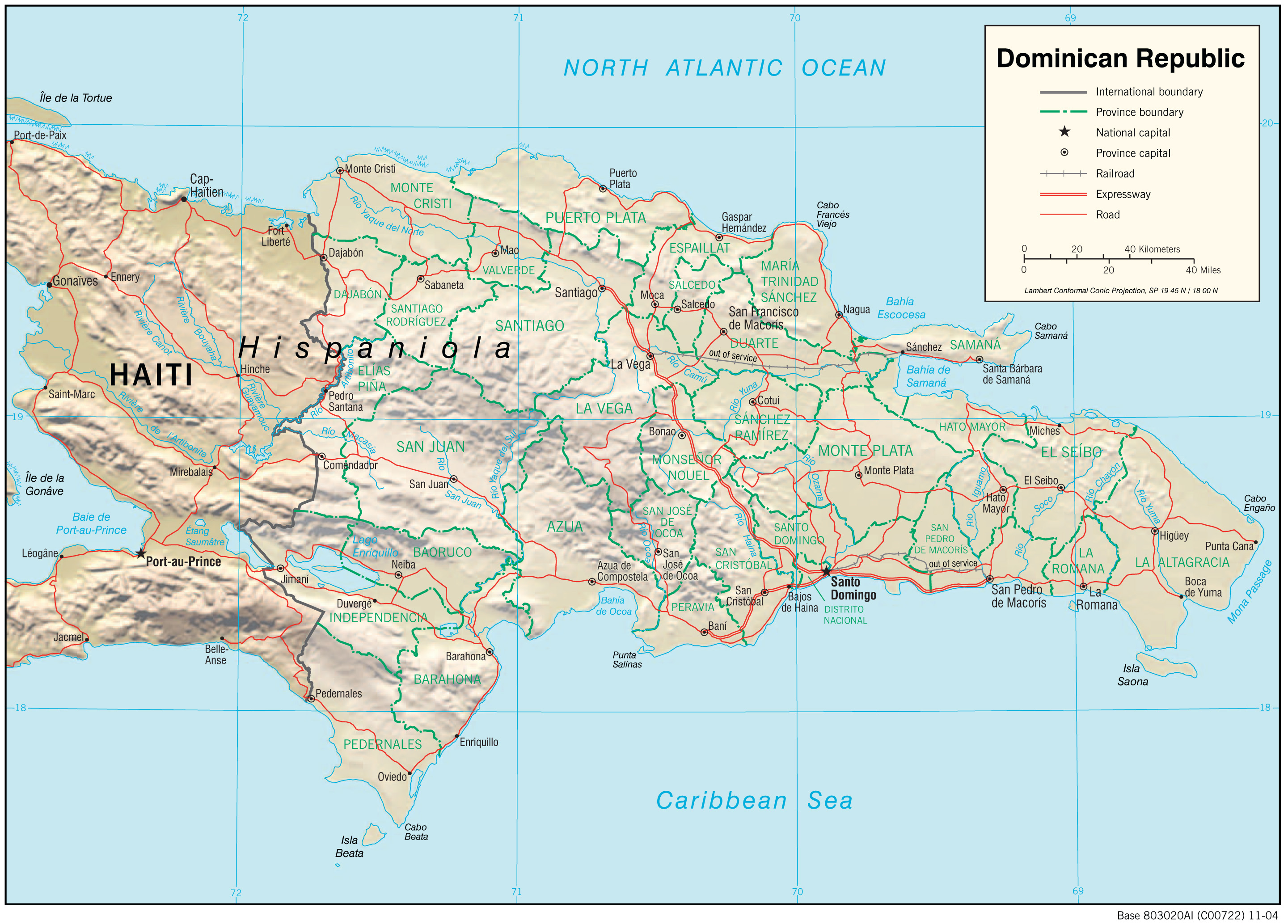
Map of the Dominican Republic

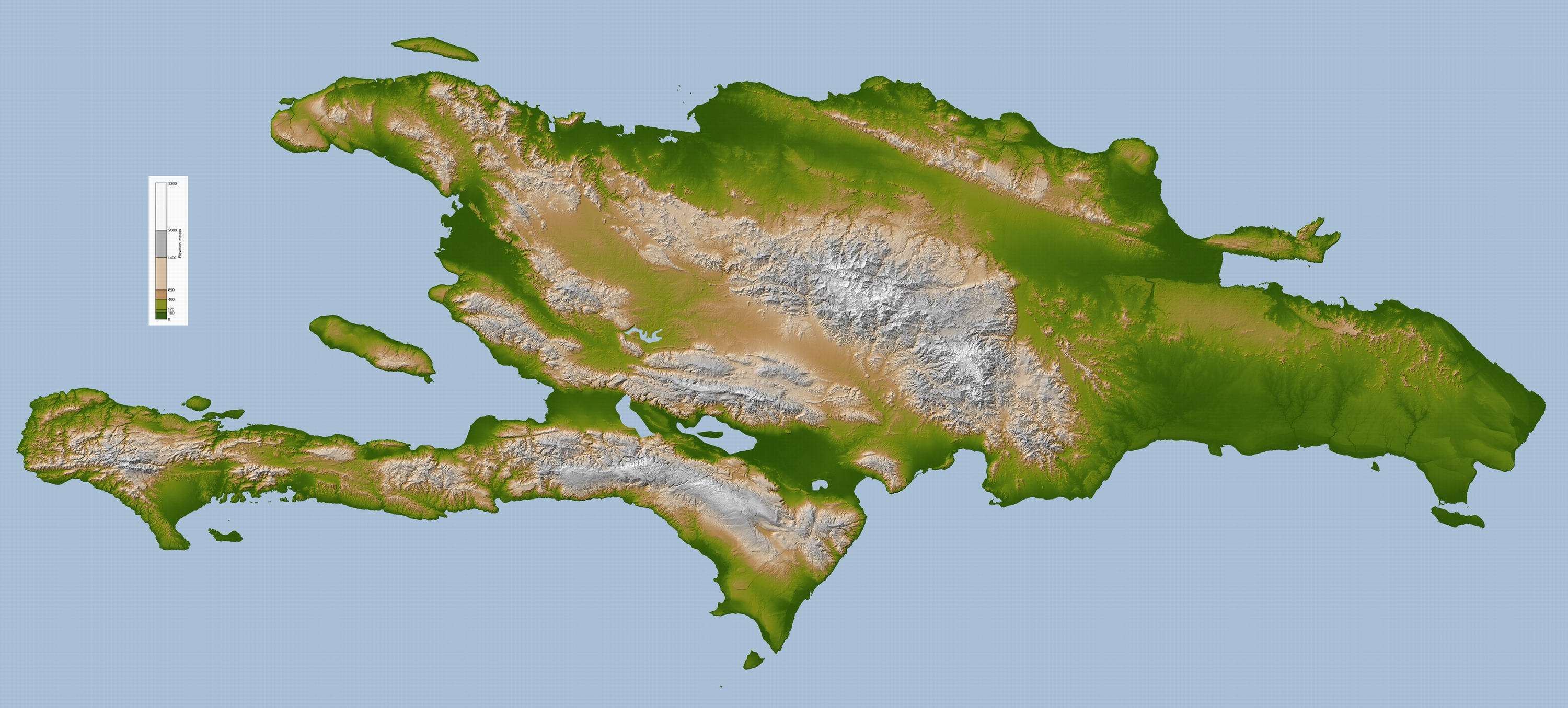
Topography of Hispaniola

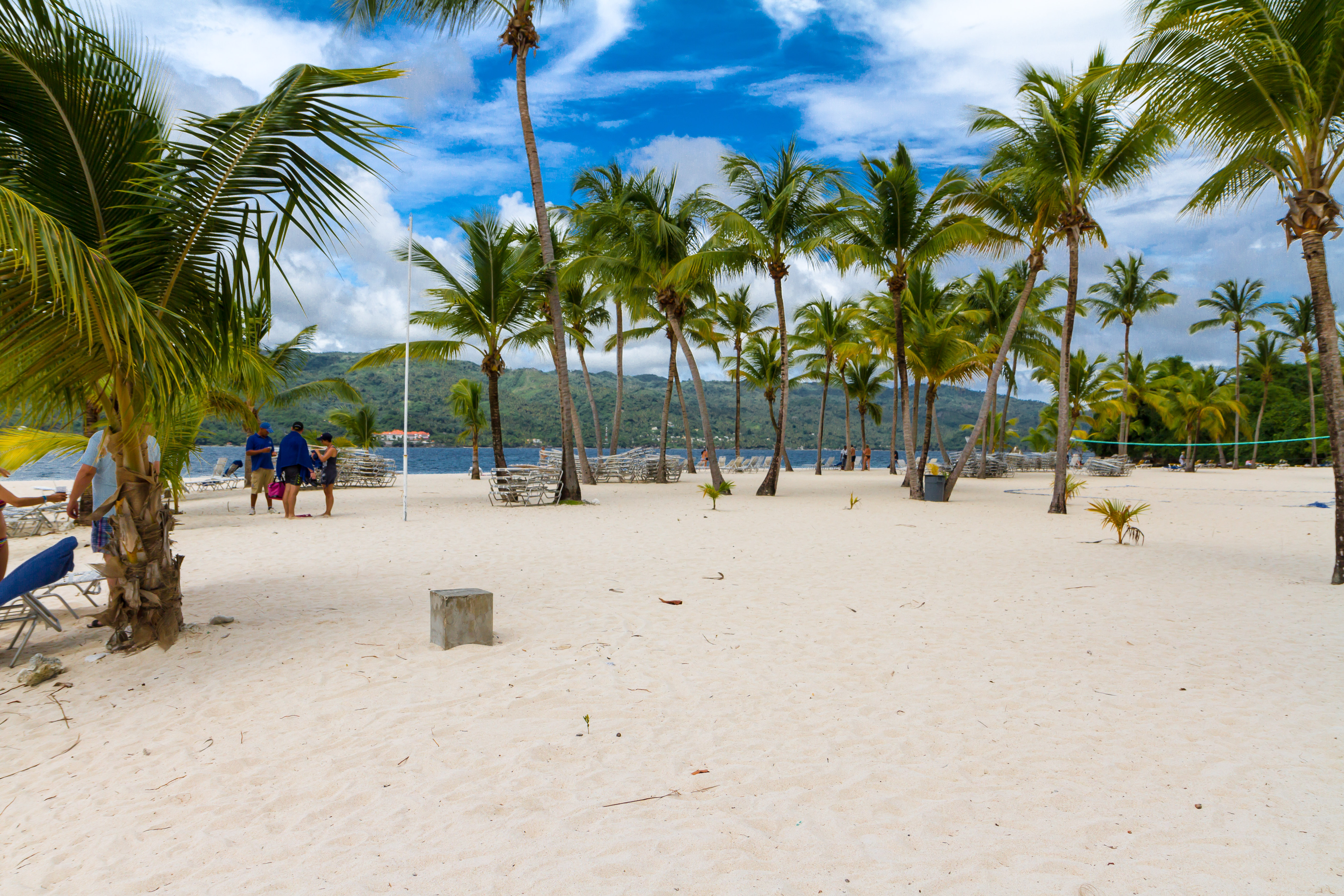
Cayo Levantado

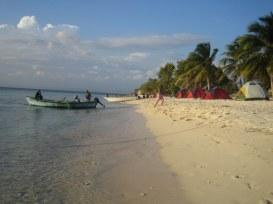
Isla Beata

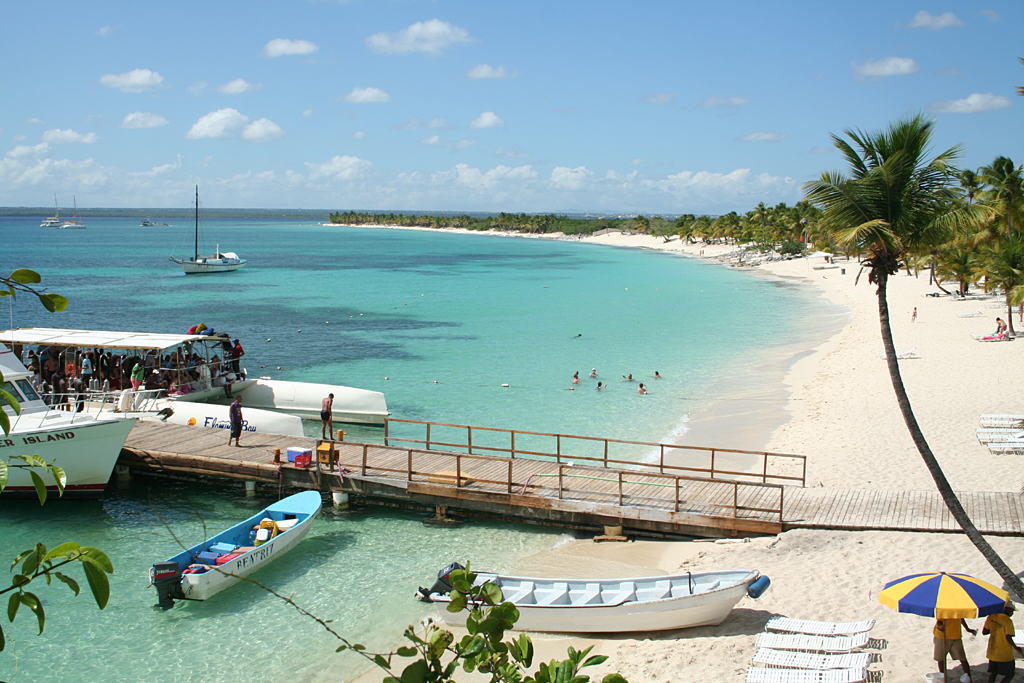
Isla Catalina

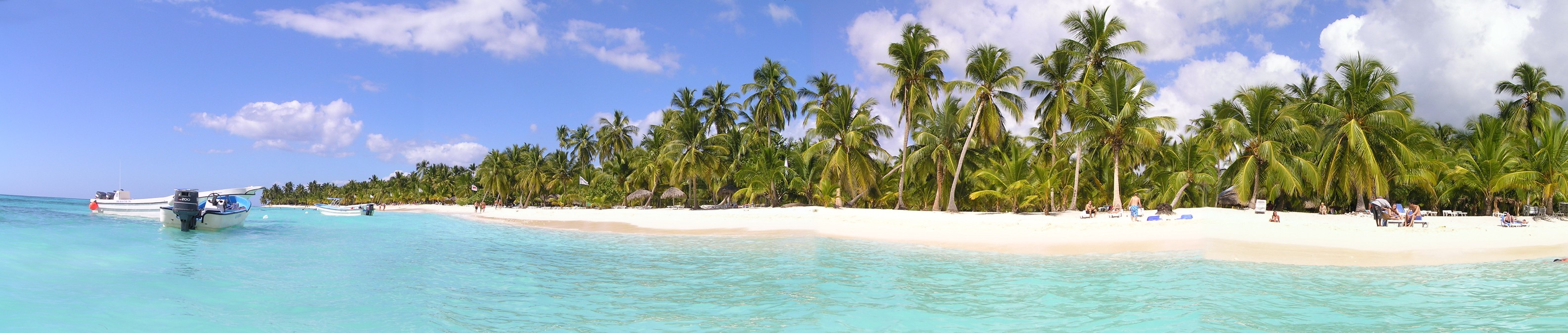
Isla Saona

The Dominican Republic, aside from being on the eastern part of Hispaniola (an island which it shares with Haiti), contains many small islands as part of a territory. There were two islands, Barbarita and Cabritos Island, that were in the Isla Cabritos National Park (Parque Nacional Isla Cabritos) on Lake Enriquillo. (The former was submerged by December 2011.) The other islands are on the Atlantic Ocean or Caribbean Sea (see map link to the right).

== Island locations ==
The locations of these islands are listed below:

- Arenas, 19°53′00″N 71°52′00″W
- Boca Chica Cay, 18°20′19″N 70°49′23″W
- Cayito de Puerto de Luis, 19°10′48″N 69°13′34″W
- Cayo Agua Dulce, 18°19′01″N 70°51′48″W
- Cayo Ahogado, 18°20′00″N 70°50′00″W
- Cayo Arena, 19°09′43″N 69°17′07″W
- Cayo Arenas, 19°52′00″N 71°15′00″W
- Cayo Arroyo Salado, 19°32′00″N 69°53′00″W
- Cayo La Bocaina, 19°00′40″N 69°11′10″W
- Cayo Cacata, 19°05′30″N 69°34′09″W
- Cayo del Calvario, 19°05′33″N 69°38′10″W
- Cayo Canas, 19°19′36″N 69°23′01″W
- Cayo El Caney, 18°20′00″N 70°50′00″W
- Cayo Chico, 19°11′25″N 69°17′45″W
- Cayo Los Corozos, 19°10′59″N 69°24′15″W
- Cayo Culebra, 19°00′54″N 69°10′16″W
- Cayo La Isla, 19°51′45″N 70°47′50″W
- Cayo La Farola, 19°10′08″N 69°16′13″W
- Cayo Garza, 19°11′00″N 69°19′00″W
- Cayo de la Garza, 19°05′49″N 69°38′29″W
- Cayo de Las Flechas, 19°11′00″N 69°16′32″W
- Cayo El Grigrí, 19°39′00″N 70°05′00″W
- Cayo Jackson, 19°17′39″N 69°39′48″W
- Cayo Limón, 19°19′43″N 69°25′25″W
- Cayo Levantado (Bacardi Island), 19°17′54″N 69°11′59″W
- Cayo Linares, 19°11′48″N 69°20′02″W
- Cayo Mondesi, 17°44′35″N 71°22′39″W
- Cayo Negro, 19°47′00″N 70°39′00″W
- Cayo Paloma, 19°11′32″N 69°19′17″W
- Cayo de Pancho Macho, 19°05′27″N 69°38′01″W
- Cayo del Papayo, 17°46′21″N 71°22′40″W
- Cayo Pelú, 19°05′22″N 69°37′55″W
- Cayo Puerto Viejo, 18°19′40″N 70°51′05″W
- Cayo Puerto Corral, 18°19′10″N 70°51′38″W
- Cayo Puertecito, 18°19′18″N 70°51′30″W
- Cayo Pisaje, 17°50′28″N 71°16′50″W
- Cayo Ratón, 18°09′49″N 68°38′43″W
- Cayo Redondo, 19°05′25″N 69°34′03″W
- Cayo del Sur, 19°10′00″N 69°16′00″W
- Cayo Vigia, 19°11′42″N 69°19′38″W
- Cayo de Willy, 19°04′54″N 69°27′55″W
- Hispaniola, 19°N 71°W)
- Isla Alto Velo, 17°28′33″N 71°38′31″W
- Isla Barbarita
- Isla Beata, 17°35′00″N 71°31′00″W
- El Infiernito, 18°48′15″N 68°33′24″W
- Isla Cabras, 19°53′16″N 71°40′05″W
- Isla de los Dos Caños, 19°47′27″N 71°45′32″W
- Isla Cabritos, 18°29′11″N 71°40′58″W
- Isla Catalina, 18°21′28″N 69°00′26″W
- Isla Catalinita, 18°11′46″N 68°38′14″W
- Isla Cerro Gordo
- Isla Cuidado, 18°06′33″N 68°34′14″W
- Isla Maria, 18°12′42″N 68°43′30″W
- Isla Saona, 18°08′48″N 68°41′16″W
- Isla La Matica, 18°26′36″N 69°36′50″W
- Islita Island
- Islote El Fraile, 19°53′30″N 71°38′58″W
- Islote Manga de Yagua, 19°44′38″N 71°43′49″W
- El Jobo, 18°18′31″N 70°52′03″W
- Monte Chico, 19°52′00″N 71°46′00″W
- Monte Grande, 19°54′00″N 71°47′00″W
- Muertos, 19°52′00″N 71°49′00″W
- La Piedra, 18°26′20″N 69°37′33″W
- Piedra de La Ballena, 19°17′52″N 69°11′16″W
- Piedra Grapin, 19°10′58″N 69°13′15″W
- Piedra Negra, 17°29′24″N 71°38′27″W
- Ratas, 19°53′00″N 71°49′00″W
- Tercero, 19°54′00″N 71°49′00″W
- Tororú, 19°49′39″N 71°47′45″W

== Banks ==
In addition, two submerged islands, banks, are part of the Dominican Republic:

- Silver Bank, 20°32′30″N 69°42′00″W
- Navidad Bank, 20°01′N 68°51′W

== See also ==
- Geology of the Dominican Republic
- List of national parks of the Dominican Republic
- List of Caribbean islands
