= Saona Island =

Island off the coast of the Dominican Republic

Native name: Isla Saona
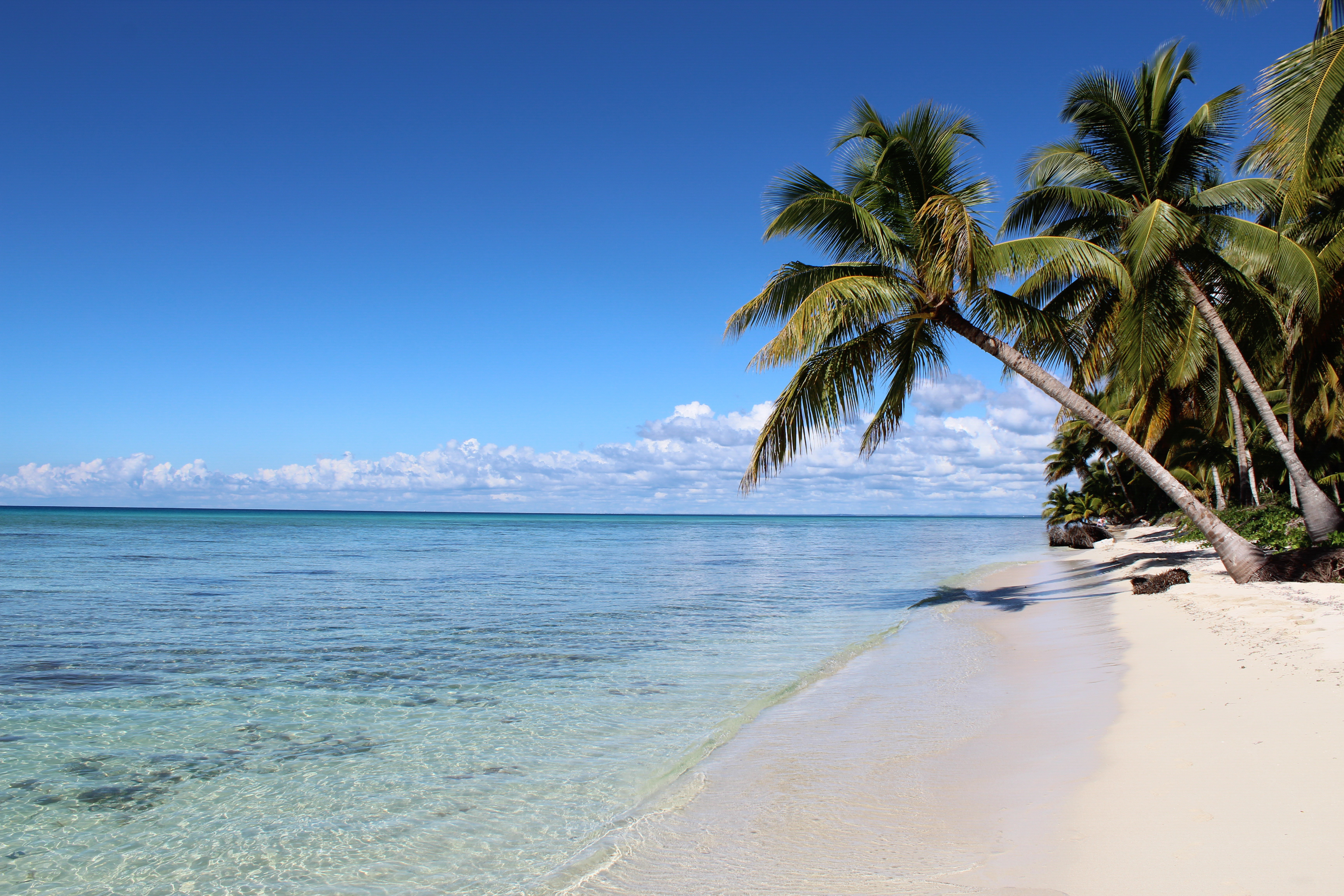
- Saona Island

- Location within the Dominican Republic

Geography
- Location: Caribbean Sea
- Coordinates: 18°09′20″N 68°41′58″W
- Area: 110 km^{2} (42 sq mi)
- Length: 25 km (15.5 mi)
- Width: 5 km (3.1 mi)
- Coastline: 47 km (29.2 mi)
- Highest elevation: 35 m (115 ft)

Administration
- Dominican Republic
- Province: La Altagracia

Demographics
- Population: 300
- Pop. density: 2.73/km^{2} (7.07/sq mi)

Saona Island (Spanish: Isla Saona) is a 110-square-kilometer (42 sq mi) tropical island located 1.5 miles (2.4 km) off the south-east coast in Dominican Republic's La Altagracia province. It is a government-protected nature reserve and is part of Cotubanamá National Park. There are two permanent settlements, the town of Mano Juan and the naval base at Catuano. The island is a popular tourist destination in the Dominican Republic.

== Etymology ==
Julian Granberry and Gary Vescelius (2004) suggest a Macoris etymology for the name Saona, comparing it with sa-ona 'full of bats' in the purportedly related Warao language of the Orinoco Delta. However, it is widely accepted that Christopher Columbus named it after the Italian city of Savona.

== History ==
Saona has pre-Columbian pictographs and petroglyphs found at Cueva de Cotubanamá. The island was known as "Adamanay" by the indigenous Taino. The island was baptized "Saona" by Christopher Columbus, who landed on it in May 1494 during his second voyage to the Americas. Columbus named Michele da Cuneo the first governor of the island. The name was meant "... to honor Michele da Cuneo, [Columbus'] friend from Savona." By 1500, the Tainos on the island provided Santo Domingo with most of its cassava.

In 1502, a ship was dispatched by the Governor of Española, Nicolás de Ovando in order to travel from Santo Domingo to the northern coast. As was customary, the ship stopped at the island in order to load cassava. In this process, one of the Spaniard crew unleashed a mastiff dog upon a cacique, who ended up mauled to death. In the aftermath, an Indian uprising and flight took place, which gave justification to the governor to march against the island (Bartolomé de las Casas accompanied the contingent). In the "pacification" of the island, many natives were killed and many were shipped off as slaves, and as a result the island became depopulated, and remained so for the following centuries.

The island is the site of a series of shipwrecks dating back to the early Spanish control of the island. At least three vessels wrecked on the island due to storm, or piracy.

Saona did not have permanent inhabitants until 1944, when the first buildings were constructed on the island. Since then a village was established at Mano Juan which has homes for the local fishermen along with boutique hotels.

== Geography ==
Saona Island is located 1.5 miles (2.4 km) off the coast of peninsula that comprises the mainland section of the Cotubanamá National Park. The island itself is 110-square-kilometer (42 sq mi) and is surrounded by the Caribbean Sea, with sandbars, and a number of coral reef ecosystems with a wide marine diversity. The island itself is covered in white sand. The northern coast of the island is more rugged, while the southern and western coasts hold the best open beaches on the island. The island has multiple lagoons including the larger Secucho lagoon located inland and the Canto de la Playa and Las Flamencos lagoons on the southern part of the island.

== Flora and fauna ==
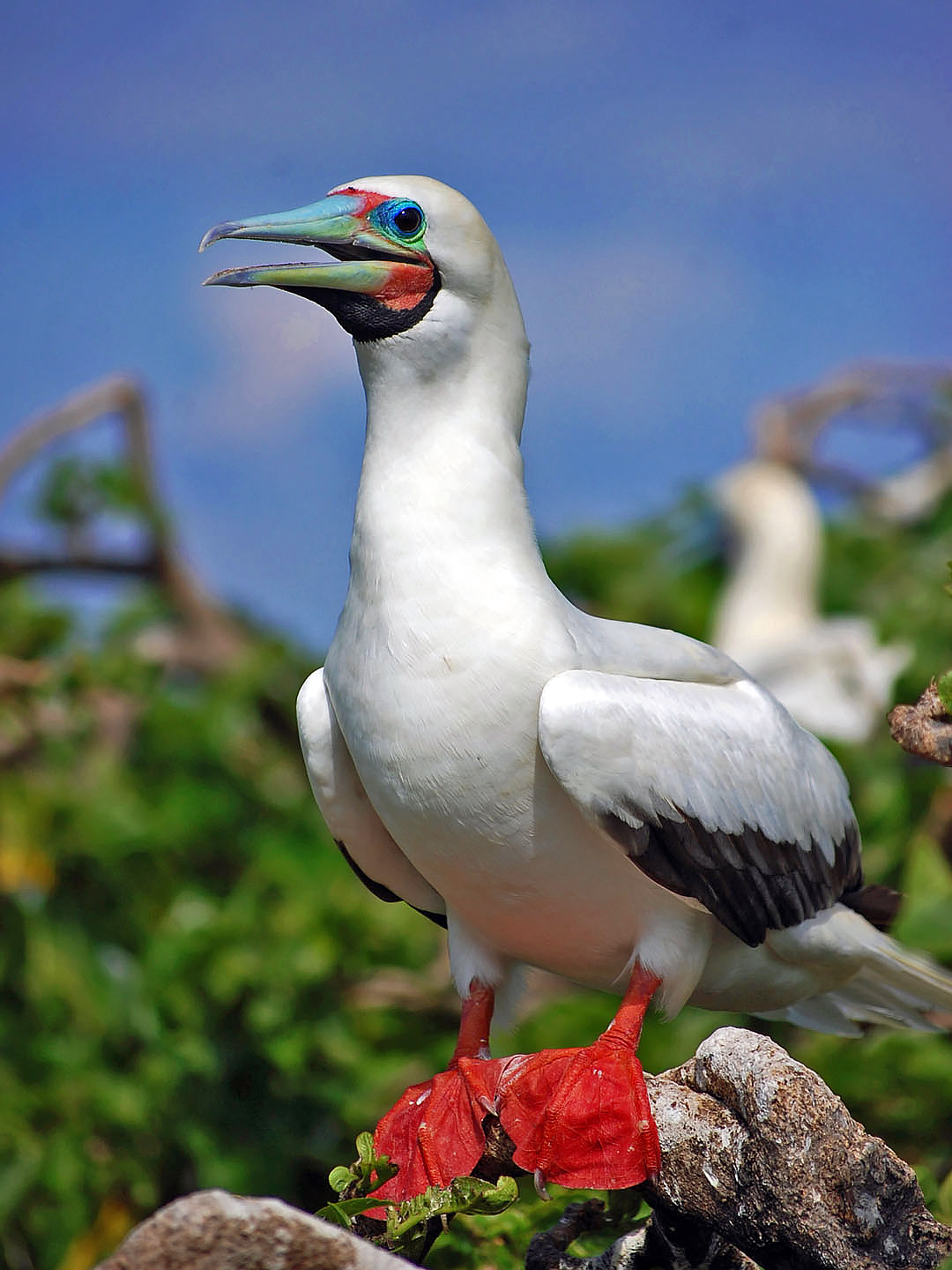
The red-footed booby or "Sula Sula" as known in the Dominican Republic

Of the 539 registered species of endemic flora within the Cotubanamá National Park, most of them are found in the diversity of ecosystems on Saona including wild bushes and mangroves, semi-humid and salted forests. Four species of neotropical mangrove are present along the Catuano Channel - red, white, black, and button mangle. The island also has large palm forests and lowland rainforest.

112 species of birds are found on the island, including brown pelicans, magnificent frigatebirds, flamingos, gulls, endemic Hispaniolan parrots, and red-footed boobies.

Saona is the Dominican Republic's most important site for sea turtle nesting. The site is threatened by climate change and coastal flooding. In the surrounding Caribbean Sea, 40 species of fish, 10 coral, and 124 mollusks can be found, with other marine life including green sea turtles, loggerhead sea turtles, manatees, bottlenose dolphins, rhinoceros iguanas, and octopuses.

== Municipalities ==
There are two permanent settlements, the towns of Mano Juan and Catuano. Mano Juan is the only inhabited village on the island. Catuano is the site of a naval base. The island is powered entirely by renewable energy produced by a solar power plant that provides electricity to the 600 residents of the island.

== Economy ==
Saona Island is one of the key tourist locations in the Dominican Republic with over 1 million visitors per year. It is the most visited protected area in the Dominican Republic, capturing 45% of the visits to protected areas in 2019.

A secondary economy is based around film production. Films such as Pirates of the Caribbean: The Curse of the Black Pearl (2003) and The Blue Lagoon have been filmed in part on Saona Island.

== See also ==
- List of islands of the Dominican Republic
