= Mano Juan =

Mano Juan-Adamanay Bella Savona
- Barrio
- Nickname: Paradise town
- Motto: “El paraíso de Bella Savona”
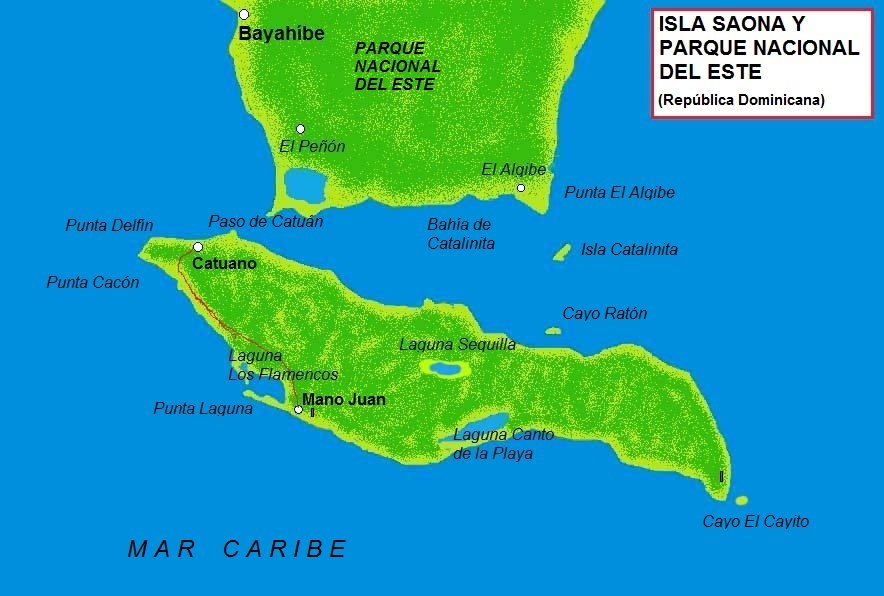
- Dominican Republic: Barrio
- Establishment of Mano Juan: 1944
- Founder: Rafael Leónidas Trujillo

Population
  - Total: 450

Mano Juan is a barrio located on the south-western coast of Saona Island in the Dominican Republic. It is the administrative center of the island.
