= Canton of Coligny =

Coordinates: 46°22′59″N 5°20′46″E

Coligny
- Former canton
- Interactive map of Coligny
- Country: France
- Region: Auvergne-Rhône-Alpes
- Department: Ain
- No. of communes: {{{nbcomm}}}
- Disbanded: 2015
- Area: 144.26 km^{2} (55.70 sq mi)
- Population (2012): 6,802
  - Density: 47.15/km^{2} (122.1/sq mi)

The canton of Coligny is a former administrative division in eastern France. It was disbanded following the French canton reorganisation which came into effect in March 2015. It consisted of 9 communes, which joined the new canton of Saint-Étienne-du-Bois in 2015. It had 6,802 inhabitants (2012).

The canton comprised 9 communes:

- Beaupont
- Bény
- Coligny
- Domsure
- Marboz
- Pirajoux
- Salavre
- Verjon
- Villemotier

== Demographics ==
Historical population Canton of Coligny
Year	1962	1968	1975	1982	1990	1999
Pop.	5,218	5,704	5,347	5,563	5,792	5,994
±%	—	+9.3%	−6.3%	+4.0%	+4.1%	+3.5%
From the year 1962 on: No double counting – residents of multiple communes (e.g. students and military personnel) are counted only once. Source: INSEE

== See also ==
- Cantons of the Ain department
- Communes of France
