= Coligny =

Coligny may refer to:

== People ==
- Coligny Brainerd Metheny (1889-1960), played football and basketball for Carnegie Tech
- House of Coligny, a French noble family, and its most famous members:
  - Gaspard I de Coligny (1465/1470–1522), known as the Marshal of Châtillon, a French soldier
  - Odet de Coligny (1517–1571), French cardinal of Châtillon, bishop of Beauvais
  - Gaspard II de Coligny (1519–1572), Seigneur (Lord) de Châtillon, admiral of France and Protestant leader
  - François de Coligny d'Andelot (1521–1569), one of the leaders of French Protestantism during the French Wars of Religion
  - Louise de Coligny (1555-1620), daughter of Gaspard II de Coligny
  - François de Coligny (1557–1591), Protestant general during the Wars of Religion
  - Gaspard III de Coligny (1584–1646), Protestant general
  - Jean de Coligny-Saligny (1617–1686), French nobleman and army commander
  - Henriette de Coligny de La Suze (1618-1673), French writer

== Places ==
- Coligny, Ain, a commune in France
  - Canton of Coligny, an administrative division in the Ain department, France, disbanded in 2015
- Colligny, formerly spelled Coligny, a municipality in the Moselle department, France
- Coligny, North West, a maize farming town near Lichtenburg, North West Province, South Africa
- Coligny Beach Park, an oceanside park with landscaped walking & biking paths on Hilton Head Island, South Carolina.

== Other ==
- Coligny (play), a 1740 tragedy by François-Thomas-Marie de Baculard d'Arnaud
- Coligny calendar, a 1st-century lunisolar calendar
- Coligny Commando, a light infantry regiment of the South African Army
- Fort Coligny, a fortress founded by Nicolas Durand de Villegaignon in Rio de Janeiro, Brazil in 1555
- Coligny-Welch signal lamp, as used on Railway semaphore signal

== See also ==
- Cologny
- Cologna (disambiguation)
- Cologne (disambiguation)
- Cologno (disambiguation)
