= Gaspard de Coligny =

Gaspard de Coligny may refer to:

- Gaspard I de Coligny (c. 1465 - 1522)
- Gaspard II de Coligny (1519 – 1572)
- Gaspard III de Coligny (1584 – 1646)

== See also ==
- Gaspard (disambiguation)
- Coligny (disambiguation)
