= Adrienne Neyrat =

French journalist, editor and activist (1862–1936)

- Neyrat, 1890s
- Born: Marie Rosalie Bouchard; 12 April 1862; Bourg-en-Bresse, France
- Died: 13 December 1936 (aged 74); Paris, France
- Resting place: Meillonnas
- Occupations: Journalist; editor; activist
- Known for: Animal protection activism

Adrienne Neyrat (born Marie Rosalie Bouchard; 12 April 1862 – 13 December 1936) was a French journalist, editor, and animal protection activist. In 1899, she founded and edited the illustrated monthly animal protection magazine L'Ami des bêtes ("The Animals' Friend"), which campaigned for improved treatment of animals and published contributions from French writers and artists. She also campaigned over conditions at the Paris municipal pound and later organised animal protection work in Bourg-en-Bresse.

== Biography ==
=== Early life ===
Neyrat was born Marie Rosalie Bouchard at the maternity hospital in Bourg-en-Bresse on 12 April 1862. Her birth was registered by the attending midwife. Her mother, Françoise Joséphine Bouchard, was a 19-year-old domestic servant from Salavre; no father was recorded. She later adopted the name Adrienne Neyrat.

By 1892, Neyrat owned the Moulin des Rochettes at Meillonnas, near Bourg-en-Bresse. She divided her time between Meillonnas and Paris, where she later lived at 83 Avenue de Wagram.

=== Animal protection work ===
==== L'Ami des bêtes ====
First issue of L'Ami des bêtes, February 1899

Neyrat founded the monthly illustrated animal protection magazine L'Ami des bêtes ("The Animals' Friend") in Paris at the end of 1898, with its first issue appearing in February 1899. She served as its directrice-rédactrice en chef. Its support committee included writers and public figures such as Anatole France, Georges Clemenceau, Jean Jaurès and Émile Zola. Other contributors included Pierre Loti, Jules Renard, Octave Mirbeau and Séverine, while artists associated with the magazine included Alphonse Mucha and Théophile Steinlen.

Neyrat's programme for the magazine used the language of animal rights. In an account of the publication in the British journal The Animals' Friend, she was quoted as stating that an animal had "a right to his rights" and should eventually be raised to the "rank of citizenship". She argued that working animals should receive treatment proportionate to their age, strength and capacity, provision after the end of their working lives, and respect for their "personality". The magazine also opposed the use of animals for entertainment, including bullfighting, pigeon shooting, cockfighting and stag hunting.

The magazine ceased publication in 1902. In August of that year, The Animals' Friend reported that Neyrat had been "compelled to relinquish" the publication because it had been unable to cover its expenses despite unpaid assistance from numerous artistic and literary contributors. It estimated that she had lost between 100,000 and 130,000 francs on the magazine during its three to four years of publication and stated that about 40 monthly issues had appeared. The annual subscription had cost six francs in France and seven francs abroad. A surviving run extends from February 1899 to May 1902.

==== Other activities ====
Neyrat, between 1894 and 1904

One of Neyrat's principal campaigns concerned conditions at the municipal dog pound in Paris. In August 1899, at the invitation of Louis Lépine, the prefect of police, she inspected the pound and criticised its sanitation and the treatment of animals held there. Historian Chris Pearson describes her campaign as part of wider disputes over the management of stray dogs in Paris at the end of the 19th century.

A contemporary report stated that, following the inspection, orders were issued to provide animals at the pound with more food and water, to retain dogs for three days before they were killed, and to allow owners into the kennels to search for missing animals. Neyrat also criticised the treatment of animals exhibited at the Galerie des Machines during an agricultural competition.

In 1906, Neyrat became a member of Les Amis de l'Éléphant ("Friends of the Elephant"), a Paris-based society founded in December 1905 under the presidency of zoologist Edmond Perrier. The organisation sought to reduce the killing of elephants, regulate the ivory trade, and promote the domestication and use of elephants for transport and other work in French African colonies.

Neyrat remained involved in animal protection after L'Ami des bêtes ceased publication. By 1924, she had founded a local branch of the Société protectrice des animaux in Bourg-en-Bresse. She petitioned the prefect of Ain for regulations concerning the transport of kids and animals intended for slaughter, the use of dogs as draught animals and methods of slaughter. A prefectural decree concerning these practices was issued on 6 March 1924.

=== Death and commemoration ===
Neyrat died in Paris on 13 December 1936 and was buried at Meillonnas. Her grave, which no longer exists, was marked by an inverted sealed bottle containing drawings of animals.

In 2021, the Paris Council approved the installation of a commemorative plaque to Neyrat. The plaque was installed on 21 March 2023 at 83 Avenue de Wagram in the 17th arrondissement of Paris, where she had lived. An earlier proposal to place it at the former offices of L'Ami des bêtes at 31 Rue Boissy-d'Anglas could not proceed after permission from the building's co-owners was refused.

== See also ==
- Animal welfare and rights in France
- Women and animal advocacy
