= Cologne (disambiguation) =

Cologne (German: Köln) is a city in Germany.

Cologne may also refer to:

== Places ==
=== France ===
- Cologne, Gers, a commune in the Département of Gers

=== Germany ===
- Cologne (region), a governmental district of North Rhine-Westphalia
- Electorate of Cologne, a state and electorate until 1803
- Free Imperial City of Cologne, within the Holy Roman Empire 1475–1796

=== Italy ===
- Cologne, Lombardy, a commune in the Province of Brescia

=== United States ===
- Cologne, Minnesota, a city
- Cologne, New Jersey, an unincorporated community
- Cologne, Virginia, an unincorporated community

== Arts and entertainment ==
- Cologne (Ranma ½), a character in the Japanese Ranma ½ manga series
- Cologne: From the Diary of Ray and Esther, a 1939 American short documentary film
- "Cologne", a 2008 song by Ben Folds from Way to Normal
- "Cologne", a 2015 song by Selena Gomez from Revival

== Other uses ==
- Cologne (perfume) or Eau de Cologne, a perfume originating from Cologne, Germany, also generically a type of perfume
  - Perfume, as a generic term
- Cologne (pigeon), a World War II RAF messenger pigeon
- Cologne phonetics, a phonetic algorithm
- Ford Cologne V6 engine, an automobile engine built in Germany by the Ford Motor Company
- .cologne, a geographic top-level domain for Cologne, Germany in the Domain Name System of the Internet

== See also ==
- Original Eau de Cologne, a geographical indication allowed for 4711, a traditional German Eau de Cologne by Mäurer & Wirtz
- Cologne I (electoral district), Cologne II (electoral district), Cologne III (electoral district), in the German city
- Colón (disambiguation)
- Cologna (disambiguation)
- Cologno (disambiguation)
- Cologny, a municipality by Geneva, Switzerland
- Coligny (disambiguation)
