= Neyrat =

French surname

Neyrat is a French surname. The linguist Albert Dauzat derived the name from noir ("black"), describing it as a regional form from the Lyonnais and relating it to the Occitan surnames Neyret, Neyraud and Neyron, and the Savoyard Neyroud. Notable people with the surname include:

- Adrienne Neyrat (1862–1936), French journalist, editor and activist
- Frédéric Neyrat (born 1968), French philosopher
