= Solnan =

River in eastern France

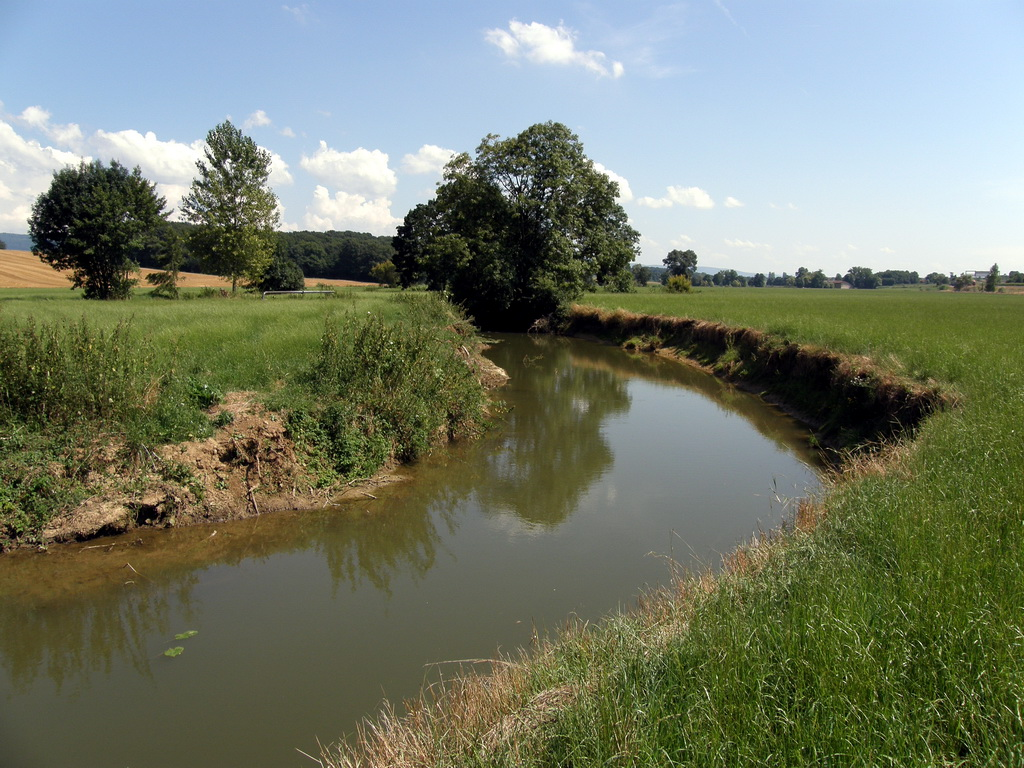

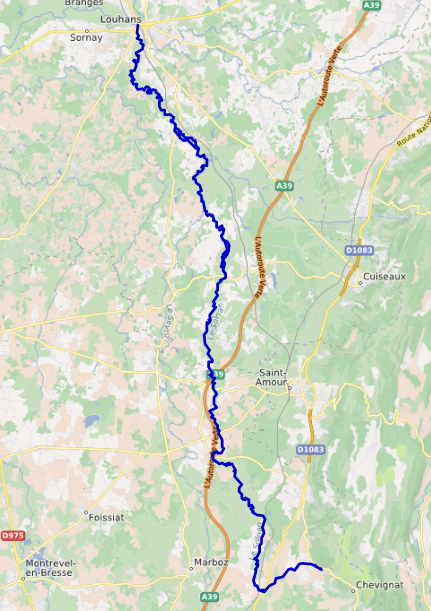

Location
- Country: France

Physical characteristics
- Source
  - location: Verjon
  - coordinates: 46°20′33″N 05°21′34″E
  - elevation: 235 m (771 ft)
- Mouth
  - location: Seille
  - coordinates: 46°37′45″N 05°13′05″E
  - elevation: 177 m (581 ft)
- Length: 61.6 km (38.3 mi)
- Basin size: 680 km^{2} (260 sq mi)
- Discharge
  - average: 13 m^{3}/s (460 cu ft/s)

Basin features
- Progression: Seille→ Saône→ Rhône→ Mediterranean Sea

The Solnan (French pronunciation: [sɔlnɑ̃]) is a 61.6-kilometre (38.3 mi) long river in the Ain and Saône-et-Loire departments in eastern France. Its source is at Verjon, in the Jura Mountains. It flows generally north-northwest. It is a left tributary of the Seille, into which it flows at Louhans.

Its main tributaries are the Sevron and the Vallière.

== Departments and communes along its course ==
This list is ordered from source to mouth:

- Ain: Verjon, Villemotier, Bény, Salavre, Coligny, Pirajoux, Domsure, Beaupont,
- Saône-et-Loire: Condal, Dommartin-lès-Cuiseaux, Varennes-Saint-Sauveur, Frontenaud, Sainte-Croix, Bruailles, La Chapelle-Naude, Louhans,
