= Varennes-Saint-Sauveur =

- Commune
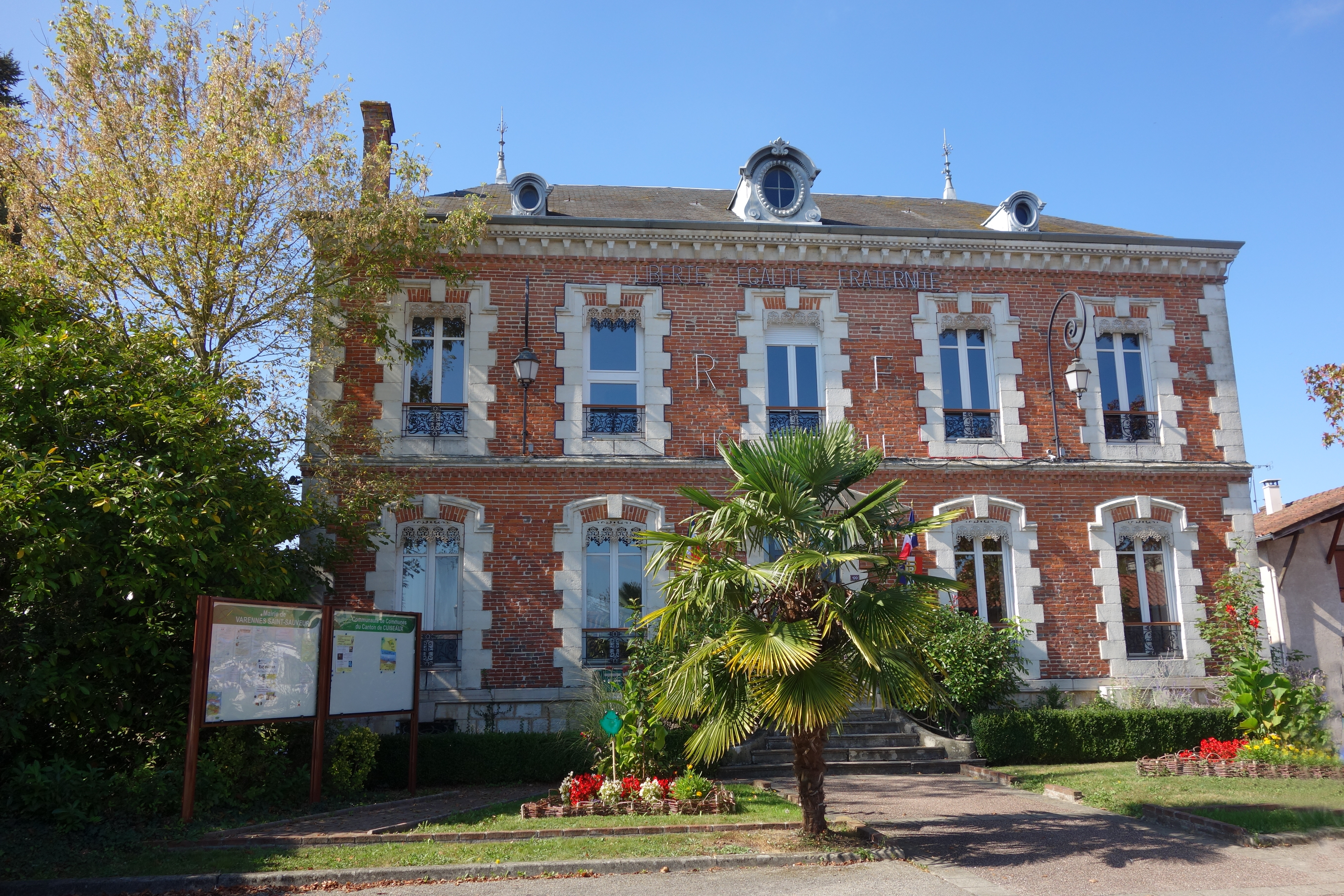
- The town hall in Varennes-Saint-Sauveur

- Coat of arms
- Location of Varennes-Saint-Sauveur
- Location within France Location within Bourgogne-Franche-Comté
- Coordinates: 46°28′59″N 5°14′38″E
- Country: France
- Region: Bourgogne-Franche-Comté
- Department: Saône-et-Loire
- Arrondissement: Louhans
- Canton: Cuiseaux
- Area^{1}: 30.16 km^{2} (11.64 sq mi)
- Elevation: 213 m (699 ft)
- Highest elevation: 219 m (719 ft)
- Lowest elevation: 182 m (597 ft)
- Population (2023): 1,108
  - Density: 36.74/km^{2} (95.15/sq mi)
- Time zone: UTC+01:00 (CET)
  - Summer (DST): UTC+02:00 (CEST)
- INSEE/Postal code: 71558 /71480
- ^{1} French Land Register data, which excludes lakes, ponds, glaciers > 1 km^{2} (0.386 sq mi or 247 acres) and river estuaries.

Varennes-Saint-Sauveur is a commune in the Saône-et-Loire department in the region of Bourgogne-Franche-Comté in eastern France.

== Geography ==
The Sevron flows northward through the middle of the commune, then flows into the Solnan, which forms part of the commune's north-eastern border. The Sâne Morte forms most of the commune's western border. Varennes-Saint-Sauveur is part of la Bresse louhannaise.

This commune offers a territory of forests and of farming where agricultural activities are the raising of milk cows and of the Bresse chickens.

La departmental highway 996 passes through Varennes from north to south.

Bodies of water

The Sevron River to Varennes, not far from the town. Several rivers run through the commune: the Sâne Morte (especially to the eastern edge of Varennes), the Sevron and the Solnan (bordering Dommartin-lès-Cuiseaux then Frontenaud). It is at Varennes that the Sevron flows into the Solnan.

== History ==
Up until the French Revolution, Varennes-Saint-Sauveur, a location of the Saône-et-Loire department which originating in 1801 on the diocese of Autun, depended on the diocese of Saint-Claude (founded in 1742).

In 1790, Buisserolles (or Busserolles), which is today a hamlet of Varennes, was at that time an independent commune attached to the Ain department and to the township of Saint-Trivier-de-Courtes, which numbered 843 inhabitants according to the 1793 census. It was attached to Varennes-Saint-Sauveur en 1793.

In 1793, Varennes-Saint-Sauveur, in the context of the Revolution, its name was changed and it became Varennes-sur-Sevron.

== Politics and administration ==
List of successive mayors Période Name Political Party Profession

    ?	        February 1816	  Pierre Joseph    Lyonnais	 	 

March 1816 January 1825 Claude Alexis Yoland de Saint-Mauris Royalist January 1825 ? Claude Alexis Yoland de Saint-Mauris Royalist

  1871	           1878	          Benoît Joseph Victor Collet	 	 
  1878	           1882	          Jacques Saulnier	 	 
  1882	           1887	          Valéry Collet	 	 
  1887	           1895	          Jean Pierre Eugène Constantin Pillard	 	 
  1896	           1933	          Victor Eugène Valéry Collet	 	 
  1933	           1946	          Claude Raffin	 	 
  1946	        March 1959	  Abel Coulon	 	 
March 1959	March 1965	  Paul Guimet	 	                                   Physician
March 1965	December 1969	  Henri Vincent	 	                                   Teacher

January 1970 March 2001 René Beaumont UMP Veterinarian, former deputy, senator and president of the general council of Saône-et-Loire March 2001 to the present Jean-Michel Longin Responsible de bases

== Demography ==
The change in the number of inhabitants has been found through the censuses of the population taken in the commune since 1793. Beginning in 2006, the official populations of the communes have been published annually by l'Insee. The census relies from that time forward on a collection of annual information, concerning successively all the communal territories over a period of five years. For communes of less than 10,000 inhabitants, an inquiry of census of the total population est taken every five years, the official populations of intervening years being as for them estimated by interpolation or extrapolation. For la commune, the first exhaustive census being in the framework of the new plan was done in 2007.

In 2016, the commune included 1,127 inhabitants, a decrease of 1.31% compared to 2011 (Saône-et-Loire : -0.18%, France except for Mayotte : +2.44%).

== Locales and monuments ==
Bresse Dairy (la Bressane) : agricultural cooperative founded in 1939 which became a private enterprise in 1992, it was reorganized in 2010 and employs 90 employees (office and production) en 2014. It processes 9,000 tons of products per year in particular cottage cheese but Bresse butter AOC, Bresse cream AOC and dairy desserts.

Tilery (17th-18th centuries), classified a historical monument. 19th century church in the central city, restored in 2000. Château Real (Royal Castle), at the entrance of Varennes-Saint-Sauveur, at the right, in coming from Louhans (beginning of the 19th century). Château du Bouchat (16th century barn transformed in the 19th century: neo-Gothic and pigeon loft). Manoir de Servillat [Servillat Manor] (19th century).

== Personalities connected to the commune ==
Brunehilde who took refuge for a time in Burgundy during the uprising of the powerful leaders of Austrasia, left the name of «La Reine» ["the Queen"] to an intersection of Varennes-Saint-Sauveur on Highway D 996 in the direction of Louhans.

Gaby Basset, French actress, wife of Jean Gabin; she appeared in 70 films between 1930 and 1967.

Bernard Bourgeois, philosopher, expert in Kant and Hegel; elected 2 December 2002 to the philosophy section of the academy of moral and political sciences, to the chair of d'Olivier Lacombe.

René Beaumont, UMP senator, president of the general counsel of Saône-et-Loire from 1985 to 2004, deputy of Saône-et-Loire (proportional ballot) from 1986 to 1988 then deputy of the 6th district (Louhans) from 1988 to 1997, defeated in 1997 by Arnaud Montebourg, member of PS (Socialist Party).

== See also ==
- Communes of the Saône-et-Loire department
