= Sevron =

River in eastern France

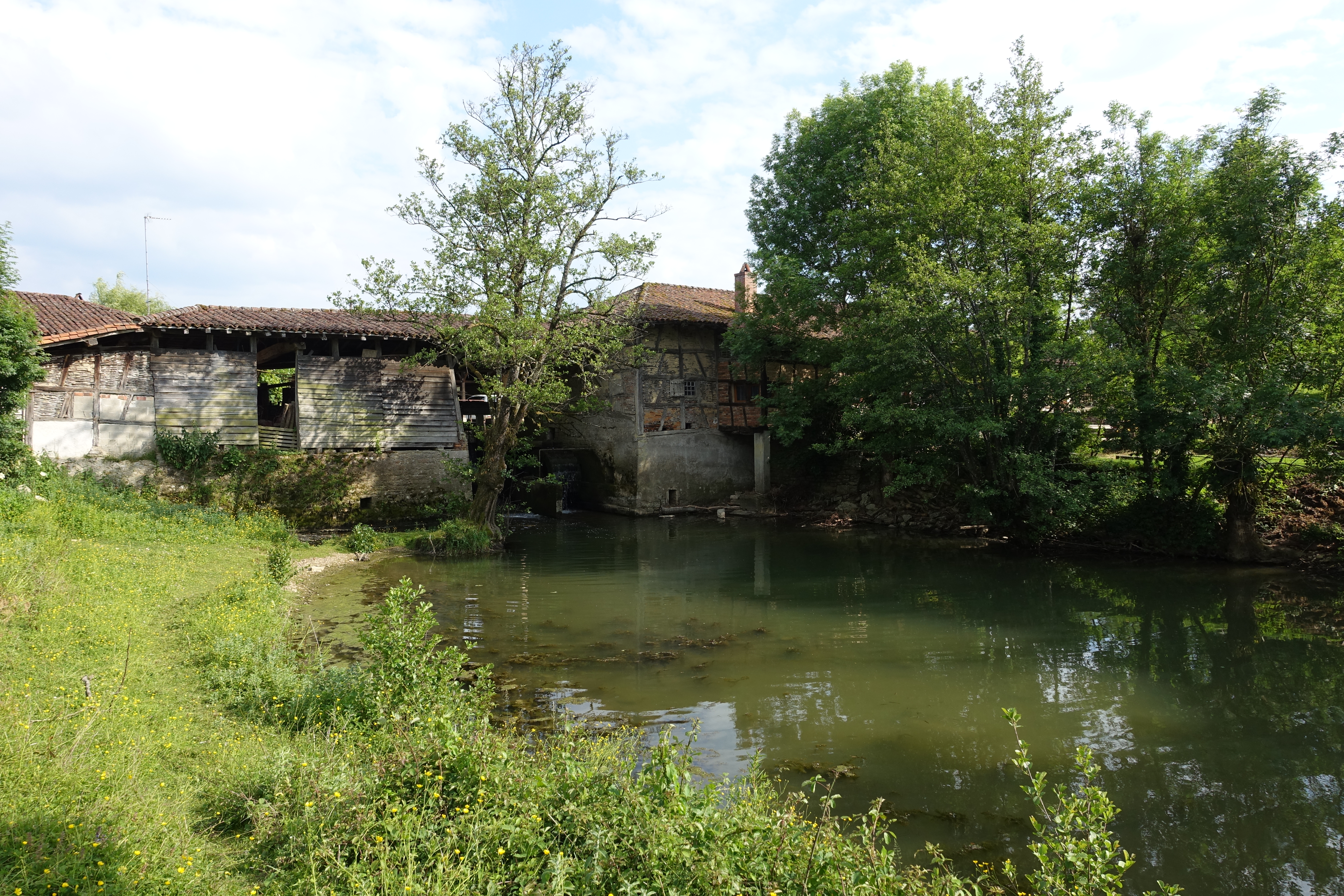

- Location within France Location within Auvergne-Rhône-Alpes

Location
- Country: France

Physical characteristics
- Source
  - location: Meillonnas
  - coordinates: 46°14′52″N 05°22′22″E
  - elevation: 360 m (1,180 ft)
- Mouth
  - location: Solnan
  - coordinates: 46°31′59″N 05°16′08″E
  - elevation: 180 m (590 ft)
- Length: 54.7 km (34.0 mi)
- Basin size: 195 km^{2} (75 sq mi)
- Discharge
  - average: 3.16 m^{3}/s (112 cu ft/s)

Basin features
- Progression: Solnan→ Seille→ Saône→ Rhône→ Mediterranean Sea

The Sevron (French pronunciation: [səvʁɔ̃]) is a 54.7-kilometre (34.0 mi) long river in the Ain and Saône-et-Loire departments, eastern France. Its source is in Meillonnas. It flows generally north-northwest. It is a left tributary of the Solnan, into which it flows at Varennes-Saint-Sauveur.

== Departments and communes along its course ==
This list is ordered from source to mouth:

- Ain: Meillonnas, Treffort-Cuisiat, Saint-Étienne-du-Bois, Bény, Marboz, Pirajoux, Beaupont, Cormoz,
- Saône-et-Loire: Varennes-Saint-Sauveur,
