= Condal =

- Commune
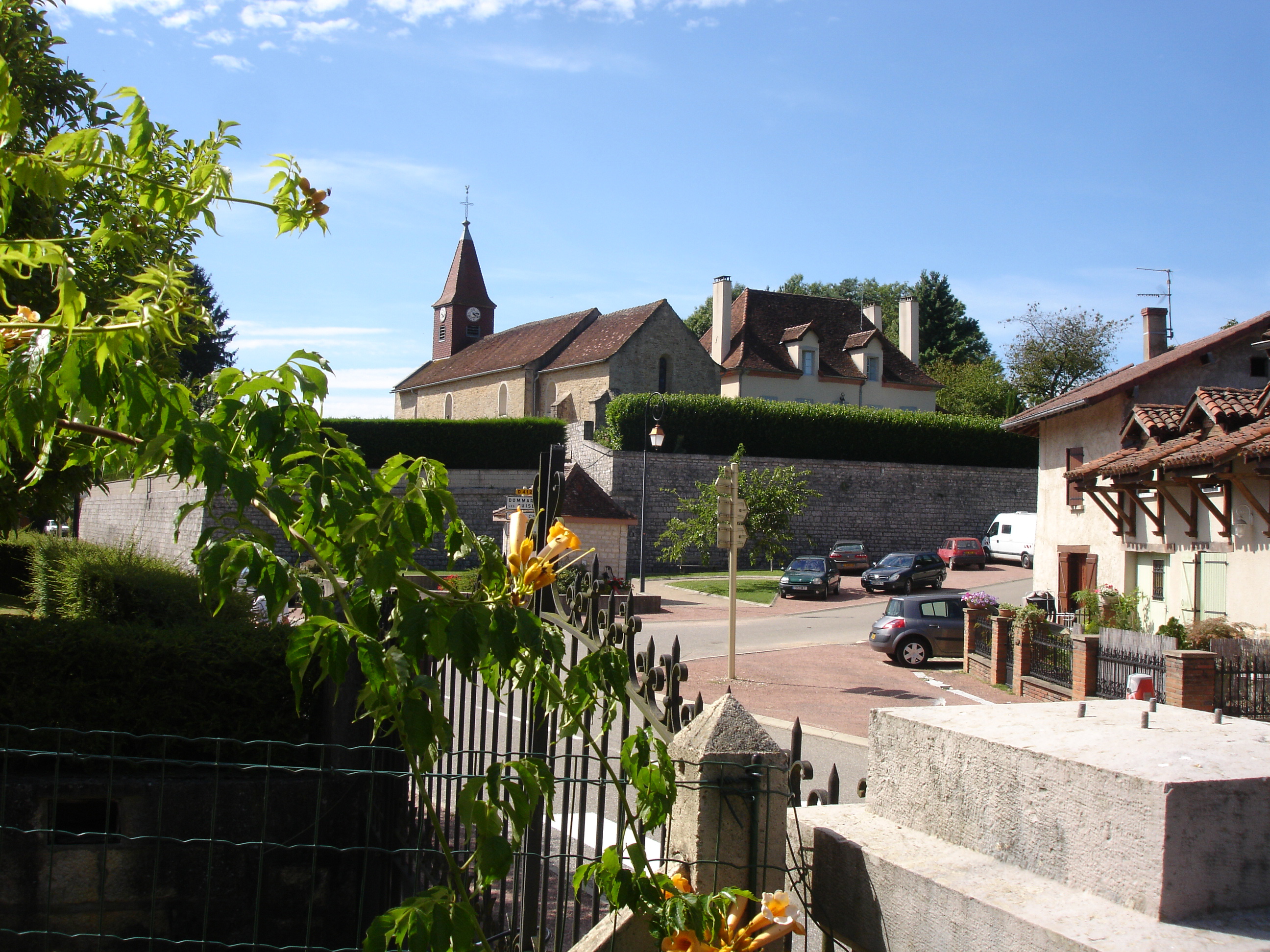
- The church and surroundings in Condal
- Location of Condal
- Location within France Location within Bourgogne-Franche-Comté
- Coordinates: 46°27′42″N 5°16′57″E
- Country: France
- Region: Bourgogne-Franche-Comté
- Department: Saône-et-Loire
- Arrondissement: Louhans
- Canton: Cuiseaux
- Intercommunality: Bresse Louhannaise
- Area^{1}: 16.43 km^{2} (6.34 sq mi)
- Elevation: 210 m (690 ft)
- Highest elevation: 230 m (750 ft)
- Lowest elevation: 187 m (614 ft)
- Population (2023): 462
  - Density: 28.1/km^{2} (72.8/sq mi)
- Time zone: UTC+01:00 (CET)
  - Summer (DST): UTC+02:00 (CEST)
- INSEE/Postal code: 71143 /71480
- ^{1} French Land Register data, which excludes lakes, ponds, glaciers > 1 km^{2} (0.386 sq mi or 247 acres) and river estuaries.

Condal (French pronunciation: [kɔ̃dal]) is a commune in the Saône-et-Loire department in the region of Bourgogne-Franche-Comté in eastern France.

== Geography ==
The Solnan flows north through the middle of the commune.

== See also ==
- Communes of the Saône-et-Loire department
