= Marie-Marguerite Brun =

French poet and lexicographer

Marie-Marguerite Brun (25 June 1713 in Coligny — 10 July 1794 in Besançon) was a French lexicographer and poet.

== Biography ==
Born as Marie-Marguerite de Maison-Forte, she took the name Brun in 1730 when she married the subdelegate of Besançon, who later became the King's Prosecutor to the financial office of Besançon.

She regularly invited writers at her home. In 1753, she released Essay d'un dictionnaire franc-comtois (a dictionary of the Franc-Comtois language) with Mr. Petit-Benoist.

In 1773, she earned an honourable mention in the Académie Française prize contest for her poem L'Amour maternel. In 1774, she published another poem, L'Amour des François pour leur roi.
