= Colligny-Maizery =

- Commune
- Location of Colligny-Maizery
- Location within France Location within Grand Est
- Coordinates: 49°05′58″N 6°19′33″E
- Country: France
- Region: Grand Est
- Department: Moselle
- Arrondissement: Metz
- Canton: Le Pays Messin

Government
  - Mayor (2020–2026): Hervé Messin
- Area^{1}: 6.77 km^{2} (2.61 sq mi)
- Population (2023): 564
  - Density: 83.3/km^{2} (216/sq mi)
- Time zone: UTC+01:00 (CET)
  - Summer (DST): UTC+02:00 (CEST)
- INSEE/Postal code: 57148 /57530
- ^{1} French Land Register data, which excludes lakes, ponds, glaciers > 1 km^{2} (0.386 sq mi or 247 acres) and river estuaries.

Colligny-Maizery (French pronunciation: [kɔliɲi mɛzʁi]; German: Kollingen-Macheringen) is a commune in the Moselle department of eastern France. The municipality was established on 1 June 2016 and consists of the former communes of Colligny (the seat) and Maizery.

== See also ==
- Communes of the Moselle department
