= Frontenaud =

- Commune
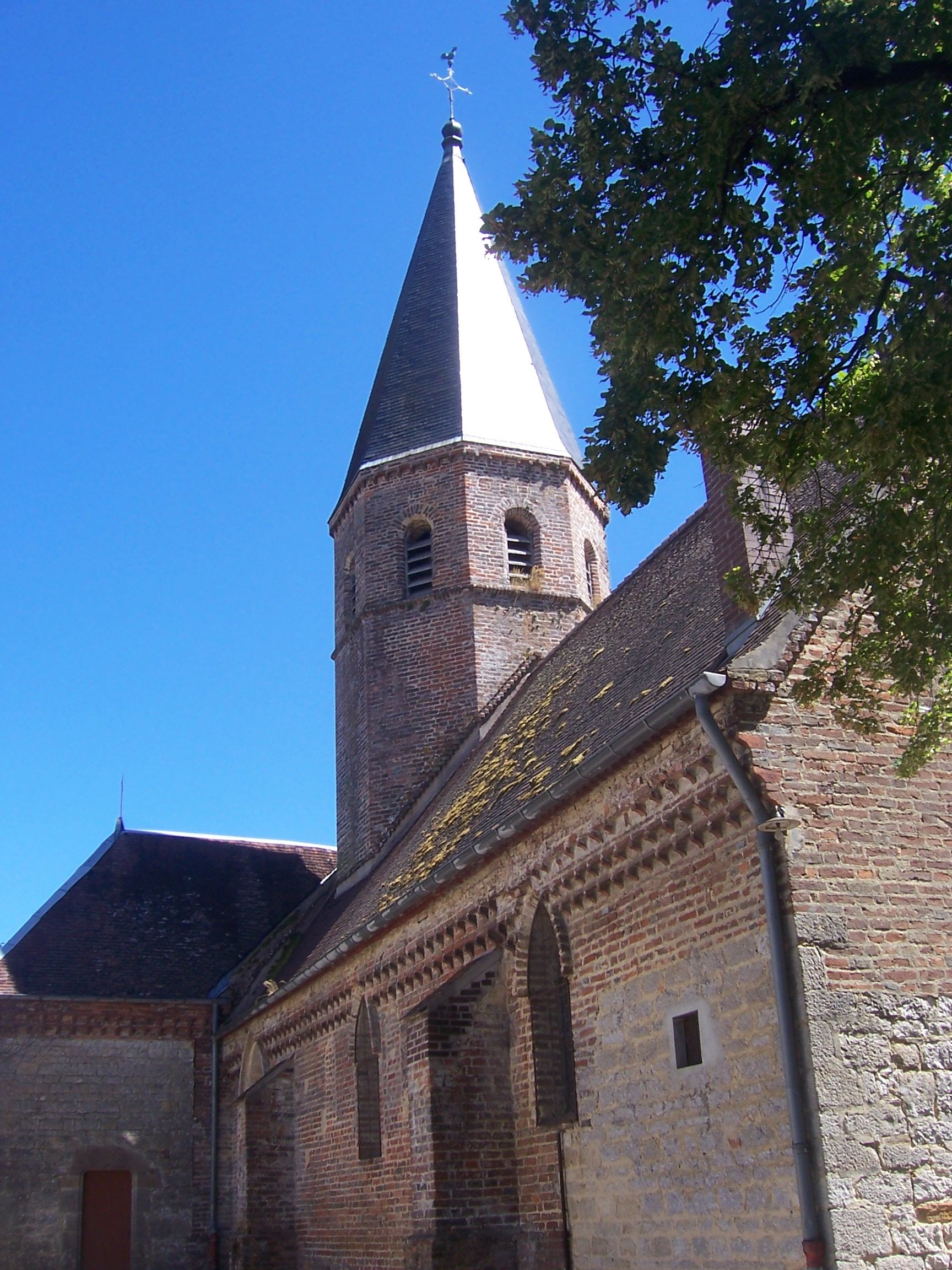
- The church in Frontenaud

- Coat of arms
- Location of Frontenaud
- Location within France Location within Bourgogne-Franche-Comté
- Coordinates: 46°33′11″N 5°17′42″E
- Country: France
- Region: Bourgogne-Franche-Comté
- Department: Saône-et-Loire
- Arrondissement: Louhans
- Canton: Cuiseaux

Government
  - Mayor (2021–2026): Christine Lourot
- Area^{1}: 15.19 km^{2} (5.86 sq mi)
- Elevation: 193 m (633 ft)
- Highest elevation: 213 m (699 ft)
- Lowest elevation: 181 m (594 ft)
- Population (2023): 725
  - Density: 47.7/km^{2} (124/sq mi)
- Time zone: UTC+01:00 (CET)
  - Summer (DST): UTC+02:00 (CEST)
- INSEE/Postal code: 71209 /71580
- ^{1} French Land Register data, which excludes lakes, ponds, glaciers > 1 km^{2} (0.386 sq mi or 247 acres) and river estuaries.

Frontenaud (French pronunciation: [fʁɔ̃tno]) is a commune in the Saône-et-Loire department in the region of Bourgogne-Franche-Comté in eastern France.

== Geography ==
The Solnan forms the commune's western border.

== See also ==
- Communes of the Saône-et-Loire department
