= Cologna =

Cologna may refer to:

- Cologna, Graubünden, a village in the municipality of Poschiavo, canton of Graubünden, Switzerland.
- Cologna Veneta, a municipality in the province of Verona Italy
- Cologna (Pellezzano), a civil parish of Pellezzano, Campania, Italy
- Cologna (Tirano), a civil parish of Tirano, Lombardy, Italy

== People with the surname ==
- Dario Cologna (born 1986), Swiss skier, brother of Gianluca
- Gianluca Cologna (born 1990), Swiss skier, brother of Dario

== See also ==
- Cologne (disambiguation)
- Cologno (disambiguation)
