= Colligny =

Commune in Moselle, France

- Part of Colligny-Maizery
- Coat of arms
- Location of Colligny
- Location within France Location within Grand Est
- Coordinates: 49°05′58″N 6°19′33″E
- Country: France
- Region: Grand Est
- Department: Moselle
- Arrondissement: Metz
- Canton: Le Pays Messin
- Commune: Colligny-Maizery
- Area^{1}: 3.61 km^{2} (1.39 sq mi)
- Elevation: 268 m (879 ft)
- Highest elevation: 285 m (935 ft)
- Lowest elevation: 218 m (715 ft)
- Population (2022): 395
  - Density: 109/km^{2} (283/sq mi)
- Time zone: UTC+01:00 (CET)
  - Summer (DST): UTC+02:00 (CEST)
- Postal code: 57530
- ^{1} French Land Register data, which excludes lakes, ponds, glaciers > 1 km^{2} (0.386 sq mi or 247 acres) and river estuaries.

Colligny (French pronunciation: [kɔliɲi]; German: Kollingen) is a village and former commune in the Moselle département of north-eastern France. On 1 June 2016, it was merged into the new commune of Colligny-Maizery.

== History ==
The earliest evidence of settlement in the village dates to the Gallo-Roman period. A Roman villa was uncovered during the reconstruction of the departmental road D4. Further excavations are being carried out in connection with the construction of the Le Domaine de Pange housing development. Archaeologists have uncovered the foundations of a 1st-century agricultural building.

The village was part of an enclave of the Duchy of Lorraine within the territory of the Prince-Bishopric of Metz. It was part of the Pays Messin.

In 1792, under the new revolutionary government, Colligny became a municipality in its own right.

In 1844, the village had 207 inhabitants and 38 houses. The school was attended by 36 boys and 16 girls, and the teacher received an annual income of 360 francs. The municipality had 364 hectares of productive land, including 45 hectares of woodland and 2 hectares of uncultivated land.

The village was the origin of the noble families of Maclot, Balbo, and Thomas de Colligny.

The municipality was transferred to the Canton of Pange on 21 November 1801 (29 Vendémiaire, Year X), having previously belonged to the Canton of Ars-Laquenexy.

In August 1840, the municipality began construction of a fountain, a ford for horses, and a covered washhouse.

The Colligny school opened in 1845. Its plans were drawn up by the local teacher, Mr. Faulin.

In 1860, the village's economy included two wood merchants, eleven egg merchants, six weavers, two carpenters, a blacksmith, a cooper, a wheelwright, two masons, and two grocers.

During the Franco-Prussian War of 1870, Colligny was the site of two Prussian field hospitals during the Battle of Borny-Colombey.

In June 1914, telephone service was introduced in Colligny.

In 1940, residents expelled from Colligny found refuge in Neuvic, in the Dordogne department.

An exhibition documenting the history of the municipality through photographs was planned for 2010.

On 1 June 2016, Colligny merged with the municipality of Maizery to form the new municipality of Colligny-Maizery. The former municipality became a delegated municipality and the seat of the new municipality.

== See also ==
- Communes of the Moselle department
