= Cormoz =

Commune in Auvergne-Rhône-Alpes, France

- Commune
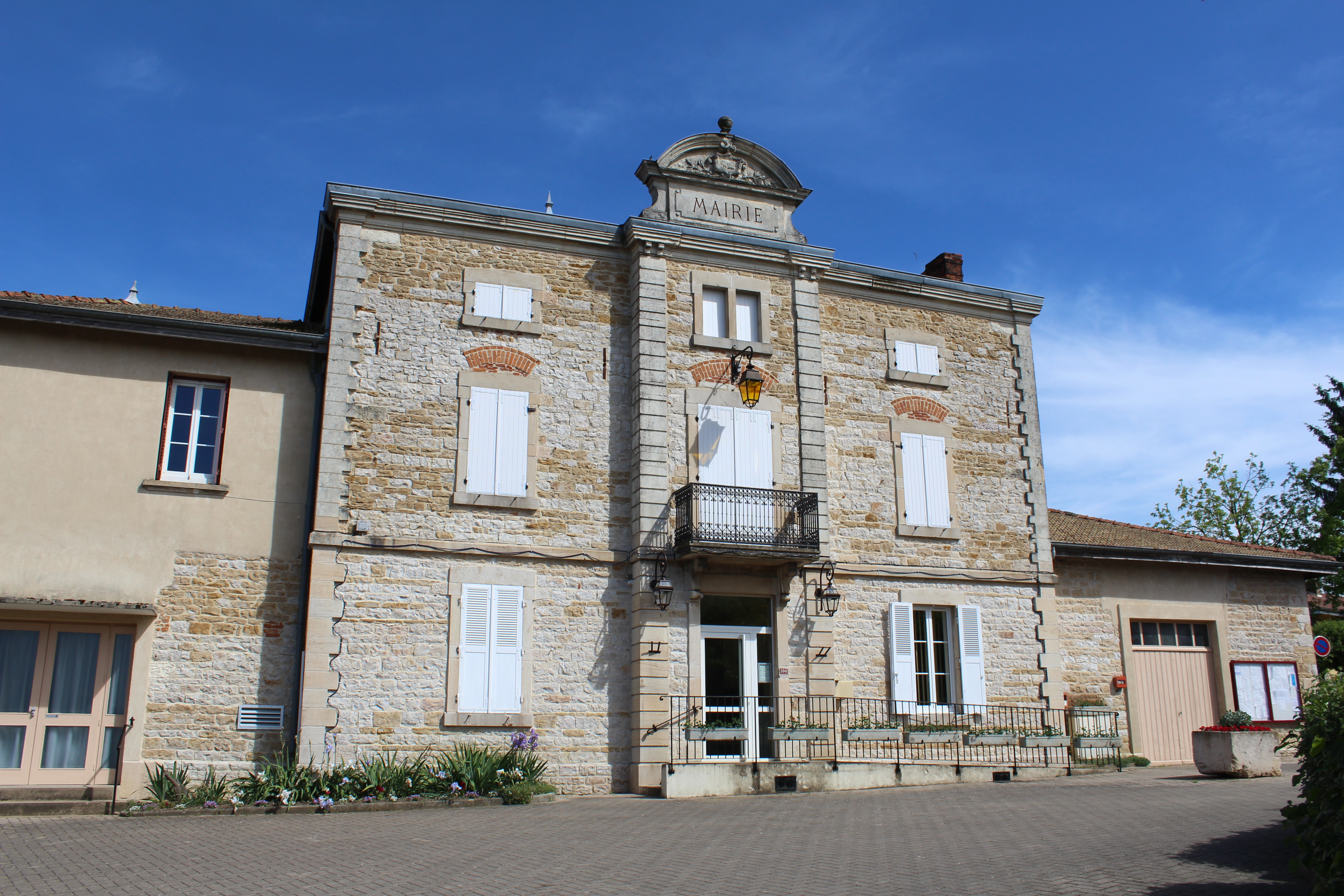
- Town hall
- Location of Cormoz
- Location within France Location within Auvergne-Rhône-Alpes
- Coordinates: 46°27′00″N 5°14′00″E
- Country: France
- Region: Auvergne-Rhône-Alpes
- Department: Ain
- Arrondissement: Bourg-en-Bresse
- Canton: Saint-Étienne-du-Bois
- Intercommunality: CA Bassin de Bourg-en-Bresse

Government
  - Mayor (2026–32): Nicolas Schweitzer
- Area^{1}: 19.56 km^{2} (7.55 sq mi)
- Elevation: 210 m (690 ft)
- Highest elevation: 223 m (732 ft)
- Lowest elevation: 187 m (614 ft)
- Population (2023): 703
  - Density: 35.9/km^{2} (93.1/sq mi)
- Time zone: UTC+01:00 (CET)
  - Summer (DST): UTC+02:00 (CEST)
- INSEE/Postal code: 01124 /01560
- ^{1} French Land Register data, which excludes lakes, ponds, glaciers > 1 km^{2} (0.386 sq mi or 247 acres) and river estuaries.

Cormoz (French pronunciation: [kɔʁmo]) is a commune in the Ain department in eastern France.

== Geography ==
The Sâne Morte forms the commune's western border. The Sevron forms the commune's eastern border.

== Population ==
Historical population
Year	Pop.	±% p.a.
1968	640	—
1975	572	−1.59%
1982	550	−0.56%
1990	502	−1.13%
1999	512	+0.22%
2007	508	−0.10%
2012	670	+5.69%
2017	664	−0.18%
2023	703	+0.96%
Source: INSEE

== See also ==
- Communes of the Ain department
