= Pirajoux =

Commune in Auvergne-Rhône-Alpes, France

- Commune
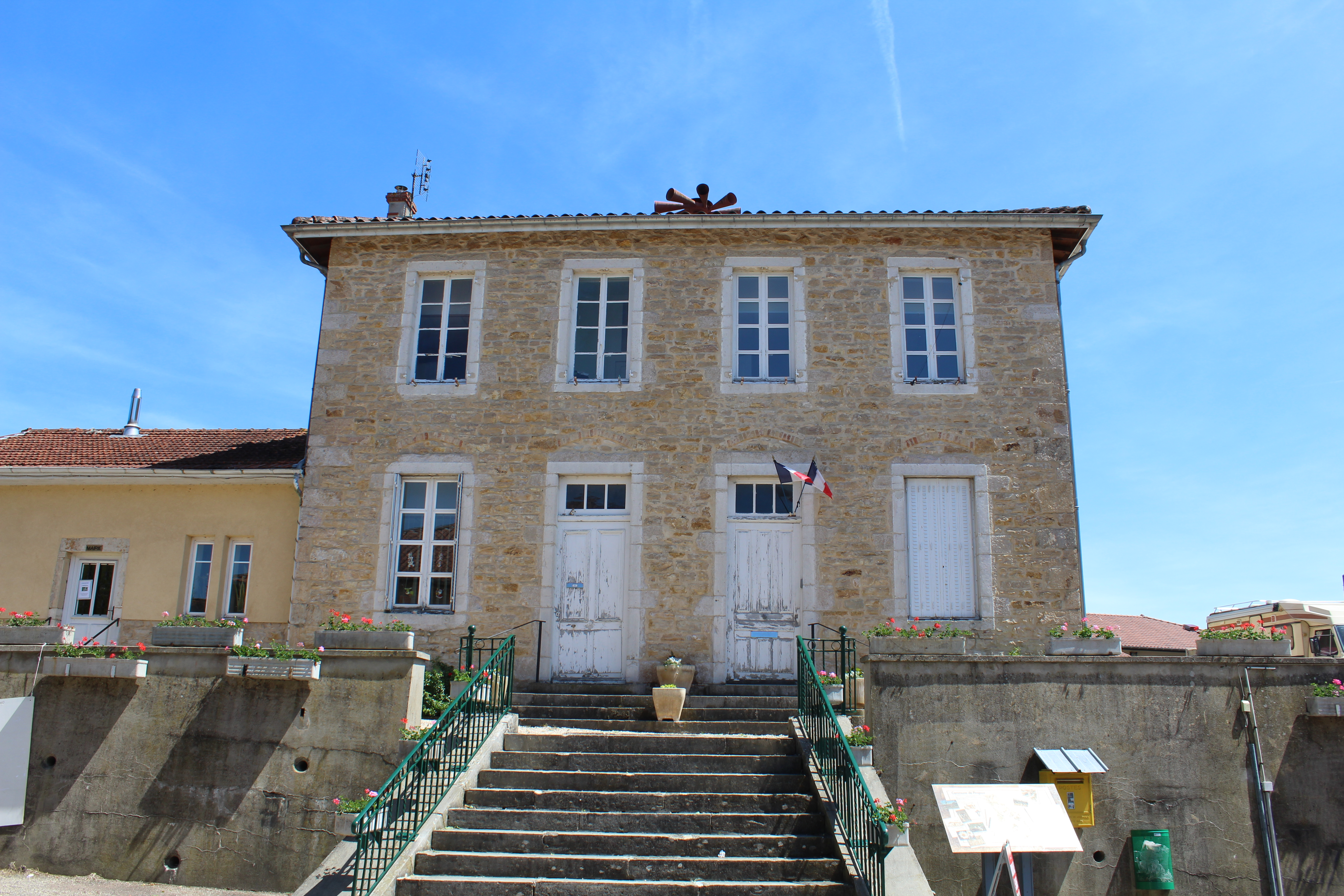
- Town hall
- Location of Pirajoux
- Location within France Location within Auvergne-Rhône-Alpes
- Coordinates: 46°22′17″N 5°17′58″E
- Country: France
- Region: Auvergne-Rhône-Alpes
- Department: Ain
- Arrondissement: Bourg-en-Bresse
- Canton: Saint-Étienne-du-Bois
- Intercommunality: CA Bassin de Bourg-en-Bresse

Government
  - Mayor (2020–2026): Noël Piroux
- Area^{1}: 12.99 km^{2} (5.02 sq mi)
- Elevation: 228 m (748 ft)
- Highest elevation: 237 m (778 ft)
- Lowest elevation: 192 m (630 ft)
- Population (2023): 397
  - Density: 30.6/km^{2} (79.2/sq mi)
- Time zone: UTC+01:00 (CET)
  - Summer (DST): UTC+02:00 (CEST)
- INSEE/Postal code: 01296 /01270
- ^{1} French Land Register data, which excludes lakes, ponds, glaciers > 1 km^{2} (0.386 sq mi or 247 acres) and river estuaries.

Pirajoux (French pronunciation: [piʁaʒu]) is a commune in the Ain department in eastern France.

== Geography ==
The Solnan forms most of the commune's eastern border. The Sevron forms parts of the commune's western border.

== Population ==
Historical population
Year	Pop.	±% p.a.
1968	375	—
1975	314	−2.50%
1982	294	−0.94%
1990	304	+0.42%
1999	299	−0.18%
2007	312	+0.53%
2012	381	+4.08%
2017	408	+1.38%
2023	397	−0.45%
Source: INSEE

== See also ==
- Communes of the Ain department
