= Cologne, Virginia =

Unincorporated community in Virginia, United States

- Unincorporated community
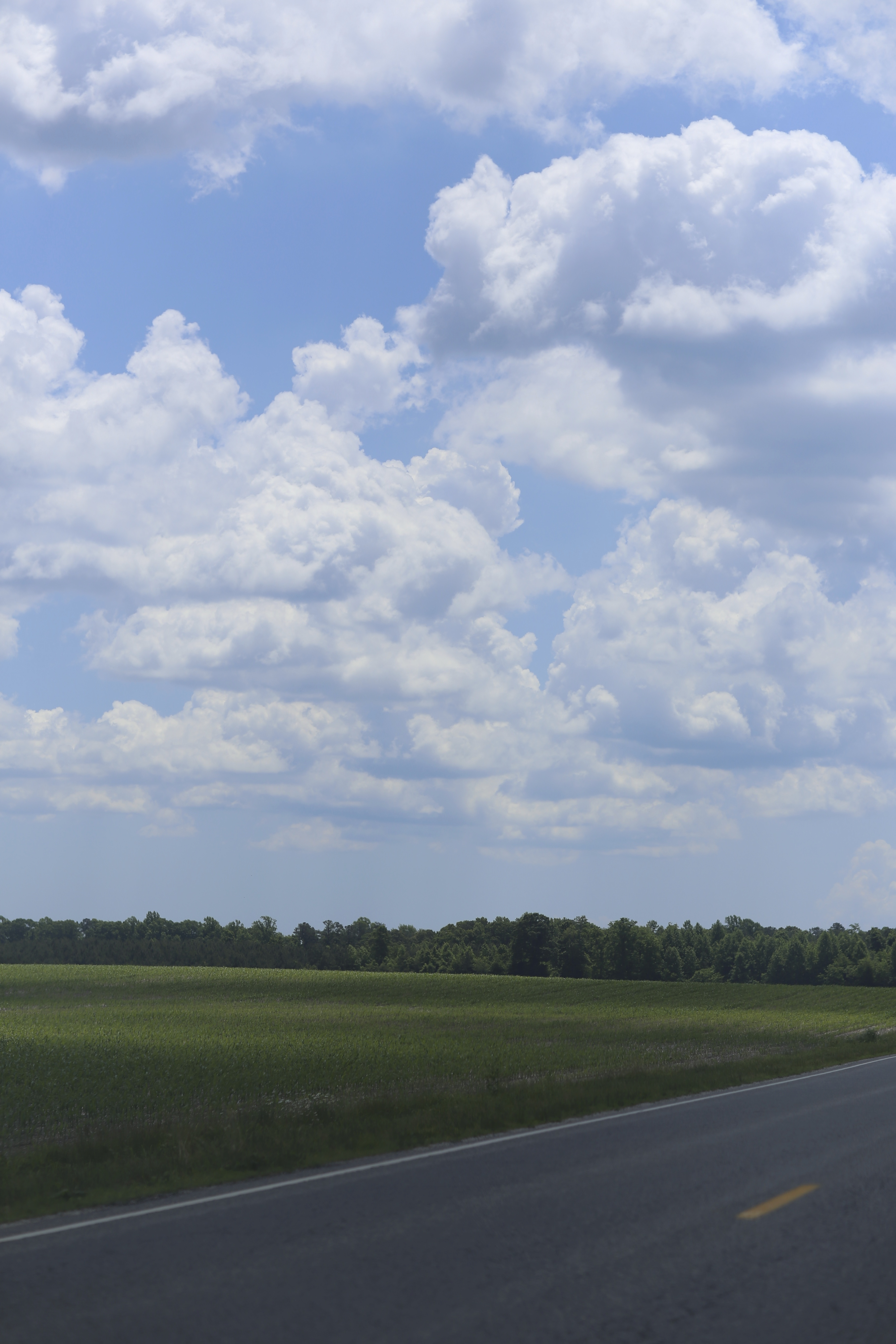

- Location within the Commonwealth of Virginia Cologne (the United States)
- Coordinates: 37°31′51″N 76°41′28″W
- Country: United States
- State: Virginia
- County: King and Queen
- Time zone: UTC−5 (Eastern (EST))
  - Summer (DST): UTC−4 (EDT)

Cologne is an unincorporated community in King and Queen County, Virginia, United States. Cologne is located at longitude -76.691 and latitude 37.531 and lies at an elevation of 105 feet.
