= Domsure =

Commune in Auvergne-Rhône-Alpes, France

- Commune
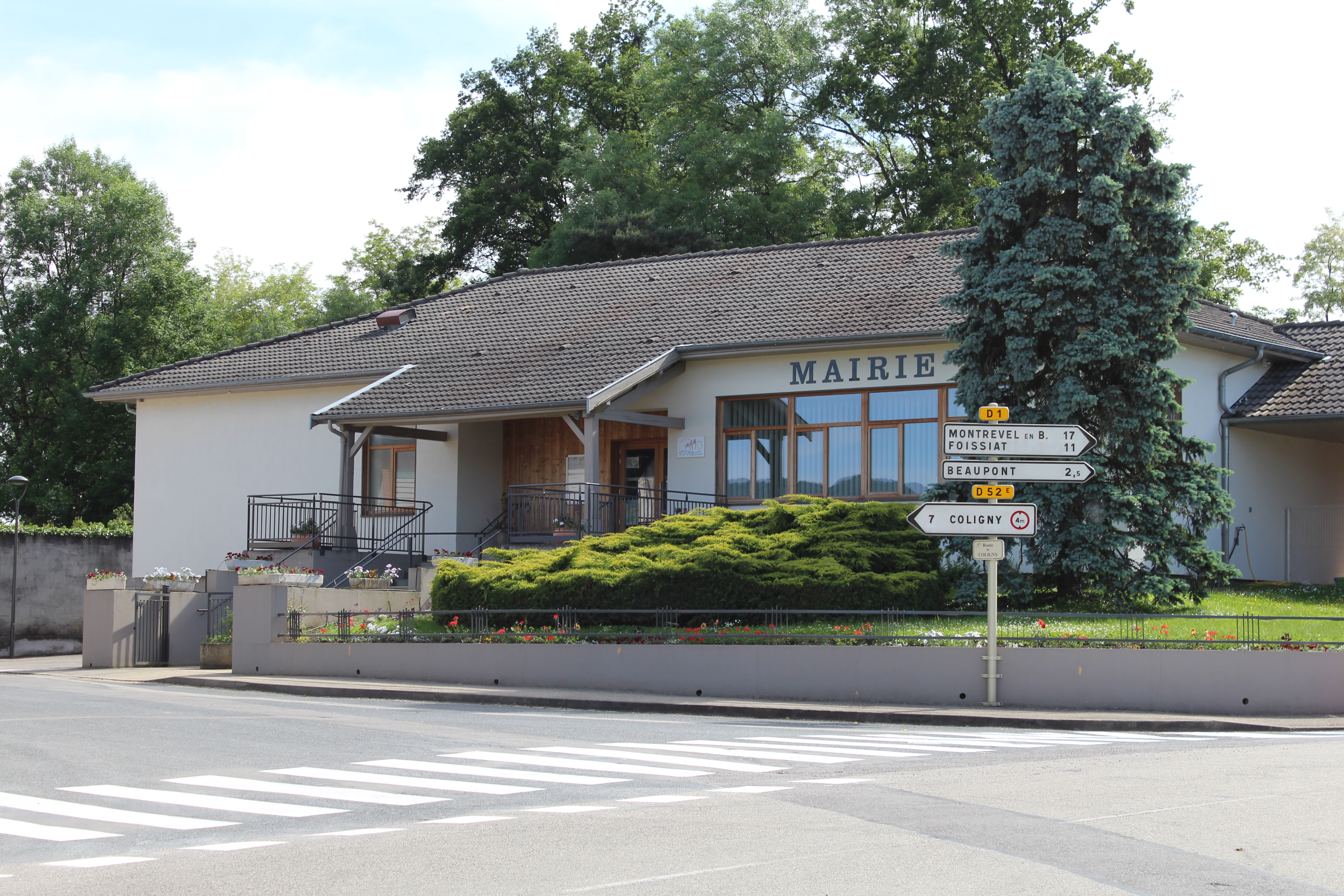
- Town hall

- Coat of arms
- Location of Domsure
- Location within France Location within Auvergne-Rhône-Alpes
- Coordinates: 46°25′09″N 5°17′43″E
- Country: France
- Region: Auvergne-Rhône-Alpes
- Department: Ain
- Arrondissement: Bourg-en-Bresse
- Canton: Saint-Étienne-du-Bois
- Intercommunality: CA Bassin de Bourg-en-Bresse

Government
  - Mayor (2026–32): Patrick Vacle
- Area^{1}: 15.20 km^{2} (5.87 sq mi)
- Elevation: 220 m (720 ft)
- Highest elevation: 233 m (764 ft)
- Lowest elevation: 192 m (630 ft)
- Population (2023): 554
  - Density: 36.4/km^{2} (94.4/sq mi)
- Time zone: UTC+01:00 (CET)
  - Summer (DST): UTC+02:00 (CEST)
- INSEE/Postal code: 01147 /01270
- ^{1} French Land Register data, which excludes lakes, ponds, glaciers > 1 km^{2} (0.386 sq mi or 247 acres) and river estuaries.

Domsure (French pronunciation: [dɔ̃syʁ]) is a commune in the Ain department in eastern France.

== Geography ==
The Solnan forms most of the commune's western border.

== Population ==
Historical population
Year	Pop.	±% p.a.
1968	501	—
1975	440	−1.84%
1982	448	+0.26%
1990	436	−0.34%
1999	403	−0.87%
2007	468	+1.89%
2012	465	−0.13%
2017	486	+0.89%
2023	554	+2.21%
Source: INSEE

== See also ==
- Communes of the Ain department
