= Meillonnas =

Commune in Auvergne-Rhône-Alpes, France

- Commune
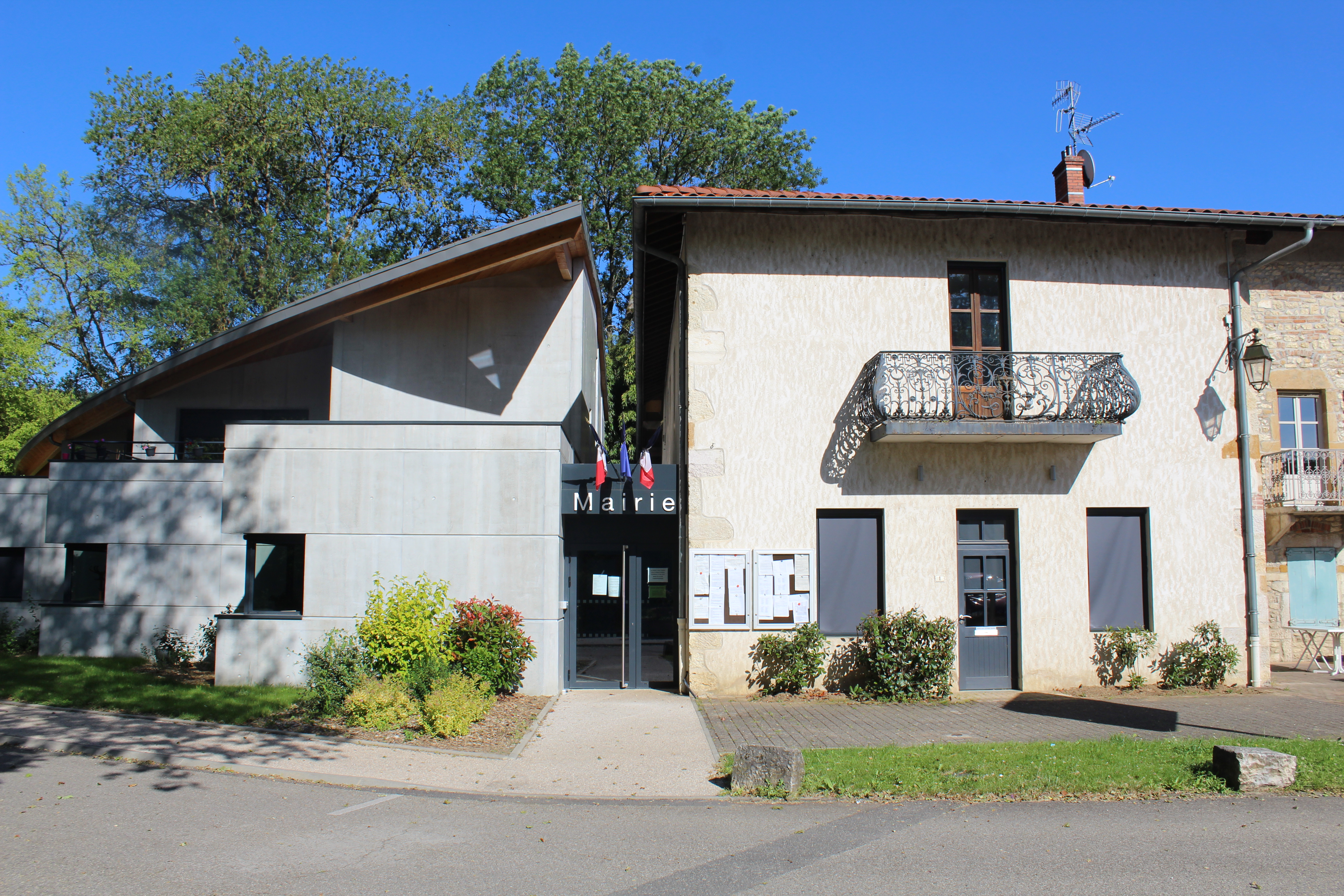
- Town hall

- Coat of arms
- Location of Meillonnas
- Location within France Location within Auvergne-Rhône-Alpes
- Coordinates: 46°14′45″N 5°21′09″E
- Country: France
- Region: Auvergne-Rhône-Alpes
- Department: Ain
- Arrondissement: Bourg-en-Bresse
- Canton: Saint-Étienne-du-Bois
- Intercommunality: CA Bassin de Bourg-en-Bresse

Government
  - Mayor (2026–32): Jean-Pierre Arragon
- Area^{1}: 17.74 km^{2} (6.85 sq mi)
- Elevation: 279 m (915 ft)
- Highest elevation: 460 m (1,510 ft)
- Lowest elevation: 232 m (761 ft)
- Population (2023): 1,426
  - Density: 80.38/km^{2} (208.2/sq mi)
- Time zone: UTC+01:00 (CET)
  - Summer (DST): UTC+02:00 (CEST)
- INSEE/Postal code: 01241 /01370
- ^{1} French Land Register data, which excludes lakes, ponds, glaciers > 1 km^{2} (0.386 sq mi or 247 acres) and river estuaries.

Meillonnas (French pronunciation: [mɛjɔna]) is a commune in the Ain department in eastern France.

== Geography ==
The Sevron has its source in the commune; it crosses the village and forms part of the commune's northern border.

The bief du Bois Tharlet, a tributary of the Sevron, forms most of the commune's western border.

== Population ==
Historical population
Year	Pop.	±% p.a.
1968	630	—
1975	671	+0.90%
1982	891	+4.13%
1990	1,051	+2.09%
1999	1,204	+1.52%
2007	1,295	+0.91%
2012	1,295	+0.00%
2017	1,335	+0.61%
2023	1,426	+1.11%
Source: INSEE

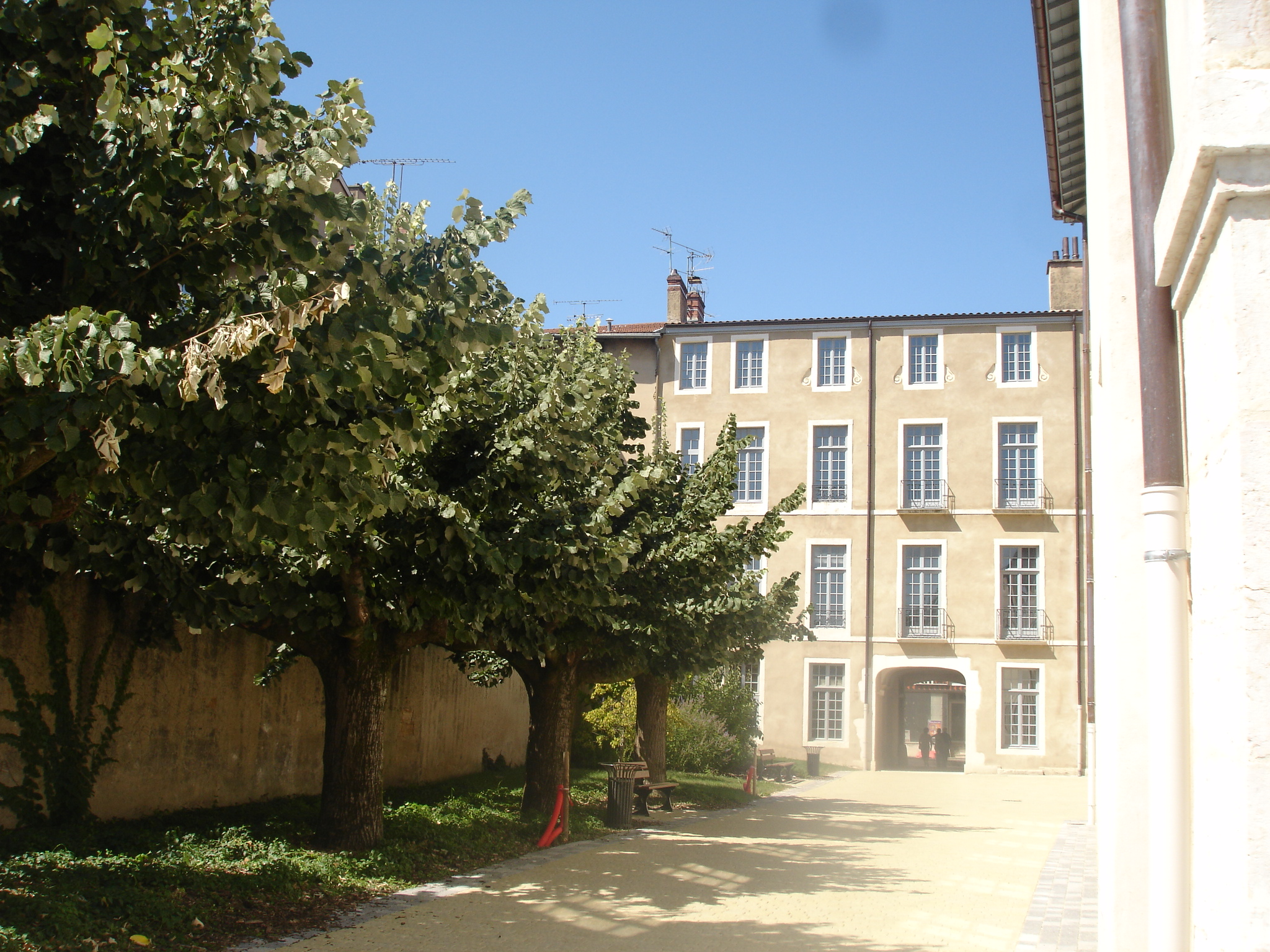
Marron Hotel

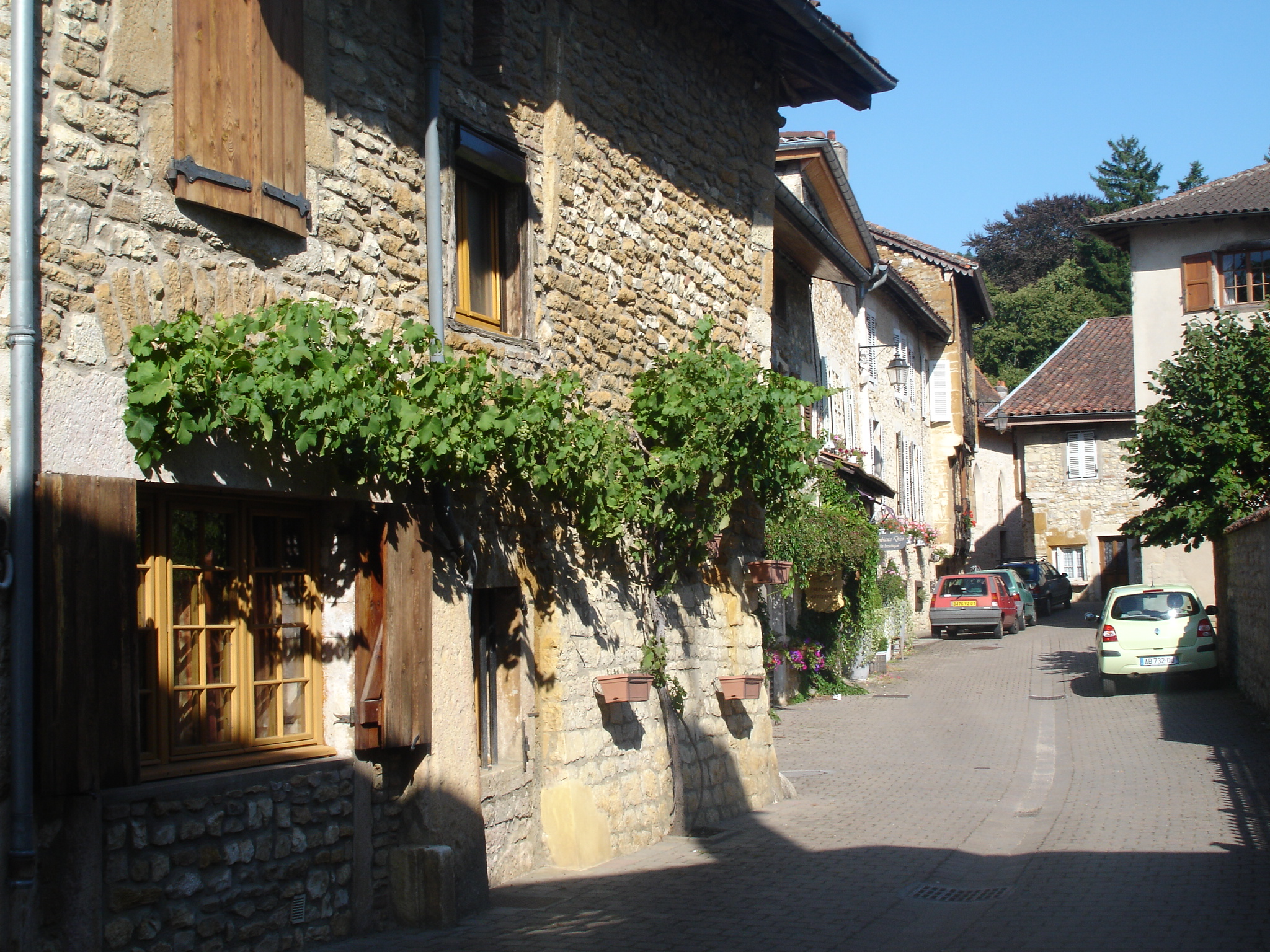
Old street

== See also ==
- Communes of the Ain department
