= Beaupont =

Commune in Auvergne-Rhône-Alpes, France

- Commune
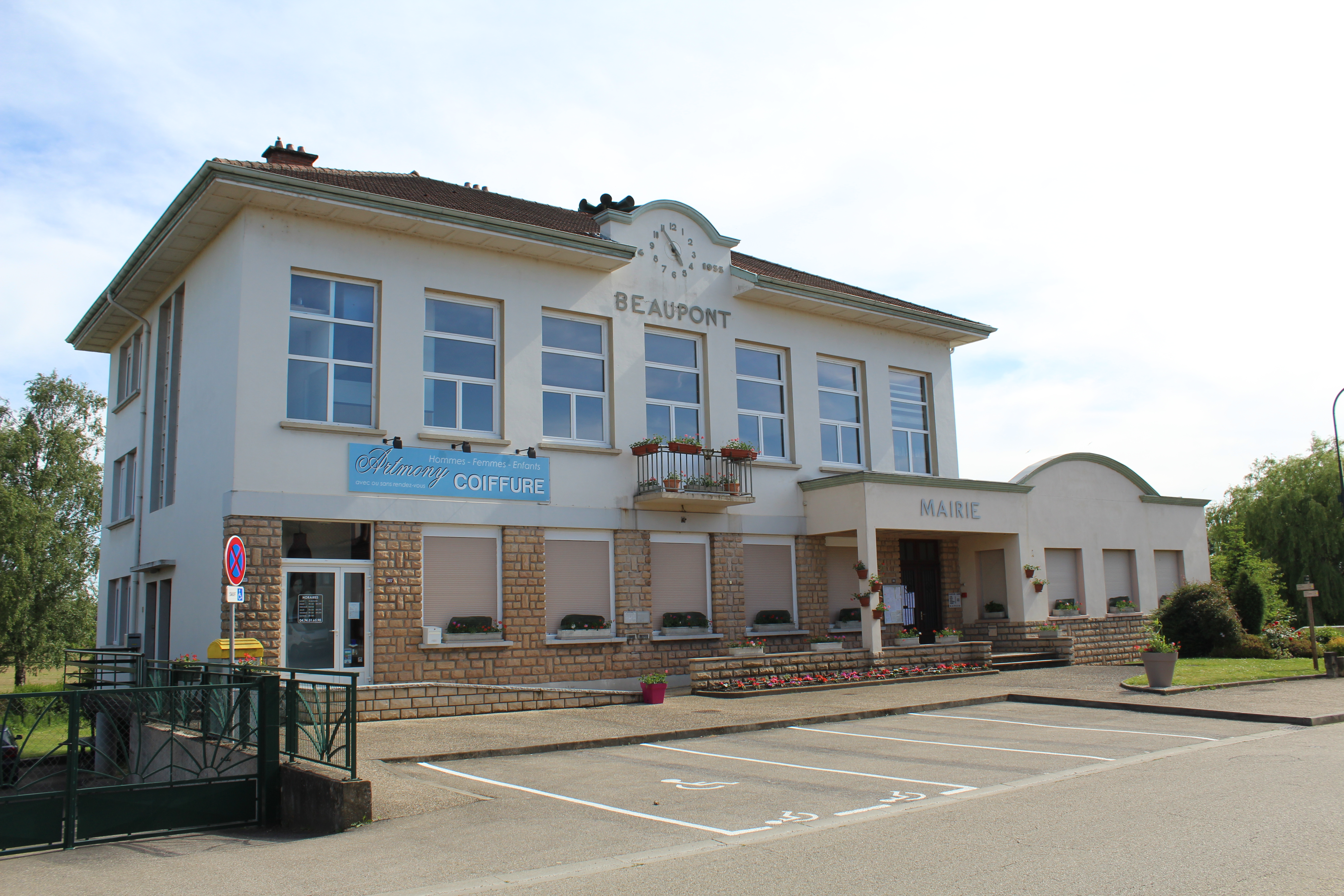
- Town hall
- Location of Beaupont
- Location within France Location within Auvergne-Rhône-Alpes
- Coordinates: 46°24′41″N 5°16′01″E
- Country: France
- Region: Auvergne-Rhône-Alpes
- Department: Ain
- Arrondissement: Bourg-en-Bresse
- Canton: Saint-Étienne-du-Bois
- Intercommunality: Bassin de Bourg-en-Bresse

Government
  - Mayor (2026–32): Gérard Janodet
- Area^{1}: 14.07 km^{2} (5.43 sq mi)
- Elevation: 199 m (653 ft)
- Highest elevation: 228 m (748 ft)
- Lowest elevation: 187 m (614 ft)
- Population (2023): 734
  - Density: 52.2/km^{2} (135/sq mi)
- Time zone: UTC+01:00 (CET)
  - Summer (DST): UTC+02:00 (CEST)
- INSEE/Postal code: 01029 /01270
- Website: https://www.beaupont.fr/
- ^{1} French Land Register data, which excludes lakes, ponds, glaciers > 1 km^{2} (0.386 sq mi or 247 acres) and river estuaries.

Beaupont (French pronunciation: [bopɔ̃]) is a commune in the Ain department in eastern France.

== Geography ==
Beaupont is 28 km north of Bourg-en-Bresse and about 100 km from Lyon. The Solnan forms most of the commune's eastern border. The Sevron forms the commune's western border.

== Population ==
Historical population
Year	Pop.	±% p.a.
1968	575	—
1975	515	−1.56%
1982	415	−3.04%
1990	422	+0.21%
1999	492	+1.72%
2007	560	+1.63%
2012	675	+3.81%
2017	689	+0.41%
2023	734	+1.06%
Source: INSEE

== See also ==
- Communes of the Ain department
