= Verjon =

Commune in Auvergne-Rhône-Alpes, France

- Commune
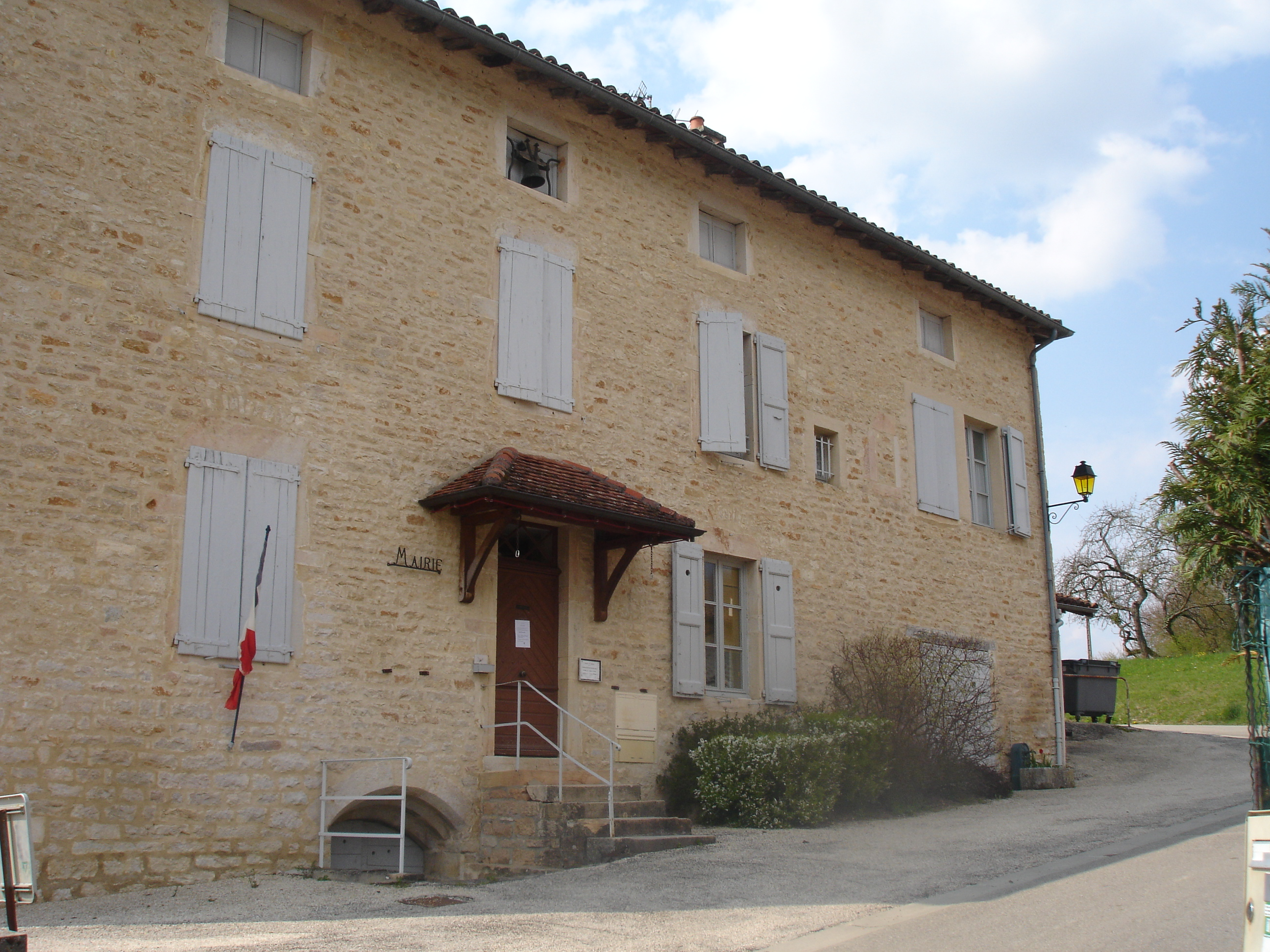
- Town hall

- Coat of arms
- Location of Verjon
- Location within France Location within Auvergne-Rhône-Alpes
- Coordinates: 46°20′45″N 5°21′05″E
- Country: France
- Region: Auvergne-Rhône-Alpes
- Department: Ain
- Arrondissement: Bourg-en-Bresse
- Canton: Saint-Étienne-du-Bois
- Intercommunality: CA Bassin de Bourg-en-Bresse

Government
  - Mayor (2026–32): Philippe Jamme
- Area^{1}: 5.11 km^{2} (1.97 sq mi)
- Elevation: 243 m (797 ft)
- Highest elevation: 496 m (1,627 ft)
- Lowest elevation: 210 m (690 ft)
- Population (2023): 346
  - Density: 67.7/km^{2} (175/sq mi)
- Time zone: UTC+01:00 (CET)
  - Summer (DST): UTC+02:00 (CEST)
- INSEE/Postal code: 01432 /01270
- ^{1} French Land Register data, which excludes lakes, ponds, glaciers > 1 km^{2} (0.386 sq mi or 247 acres) and river estuaries.

Verjon (French pronunciation: [vɛʁʒɔ̃]; Arpitan: Vrejon) is a commune in the Ain department in eastern France.

== Geography ==
The Solnan has its source in the commune and forms part of its southwestern border.

== Population ==
Historical population
Year	Pop.	±% p.a.
1968	205	—
1975	187	−1.30%
1982	209	+1.60%
1990	235	+1.48%
1999	192	−2.22%
2007	244	+3.04%
2012	256	+0.96%
2017	295	+2.88%
2023	346	+2.69%
Source: INSEE

== See also ==
- Communes of the Ain department
