= Bény =

Commune in Auvergne-Rhône-Alpes, France

- Commune
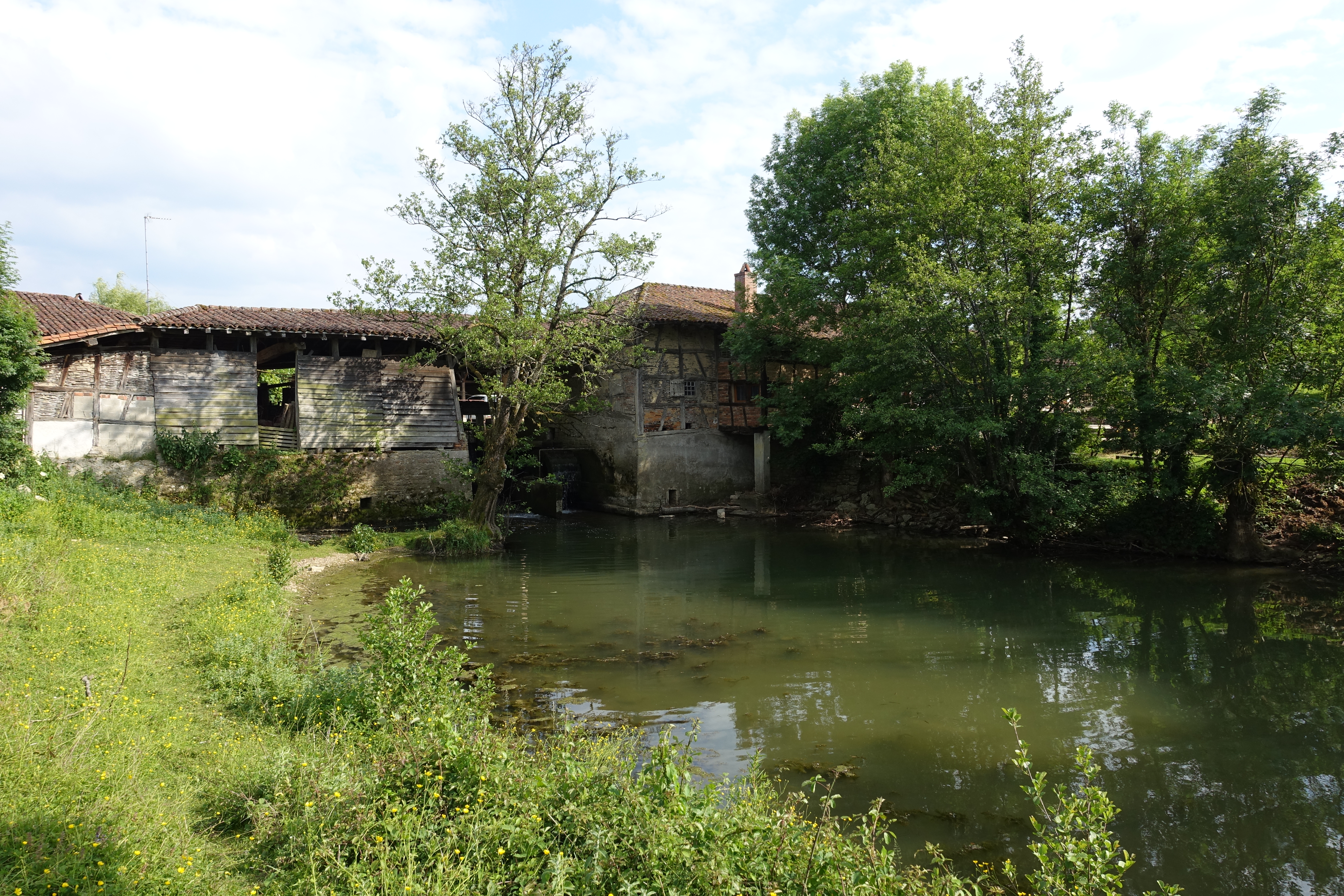
- Watermill
- Location of Bény
- Location within France Location within Auvergne-Rhône-Alpes
- Coordinates: 46°19′10″N 5°17′00″E
- Country: France
- Region: Auvergne-Rhône-Alpes
- Department: Ain
- Arrondissement: Bourg-en-Bresse
- Canton: Saint-Étienne-du-Bois
- Intercommunality: Bassin de Bourg-en-Bresse

Government
  - Mayor (2026–32): Mélynda Berrod
- Area^{1}: 18.25 km^{2} (7.05 sq mi)
- Elevation: 228 m (748 ft)
- Highest elevation: 244 m (801 ft)
- Lowest elevation: 200 m (660 ft)
- Population (2023): 777
  - Density: 42.6/km^{2} (110/sq mi)
- Time zone: UTC+01:00 (CET)
  - Summer (DST): UTC+02:00 (CEST)
- INSEE/Postal code: 01038 /01370
- Website: https://mairie-beny.fr/
- ^{1} French Land Register data, which excludes lakes, ponds, glaciers > 1 km^{2} (0.386 sq mi or 247 acres) and river estuaries.

Bény (French pronunciation: [beni]) is a commune in the Ain department in central-eastern France.

== Geography ==
The bief du Lignon forms the commune's southeastern border, then flows into the Solnan, which forms most of its northeastern border.

The Sevron flows northwest through the middle of the commune.

== Population ==
Historical population
Year	Pop.	±% p.a.
1968	566	—
1975	503	−1.67%
1982	537	+0.94%
1990	587	+1.12%
1999	613	+0.48%
2007	729	+2.19%
2012	718	−0.30%
2017	756	+1.04%
2023	777	+0.46%
Source: INSEE

== See also ==
- Communes of the Ain department
