= Cologno =

Cologno may refer to 2 Italian municipalities in Lombardy:

- Cologno al Serio, in the Province of Bergamo
- Cologno Monzese, in the Province of Milan

== See also ==
- Cologna (disambiguation)
- Cologne (disambiguation)
