= Marboz =

Commune in Auvergne-Rhône-Alpes, France

- Commune
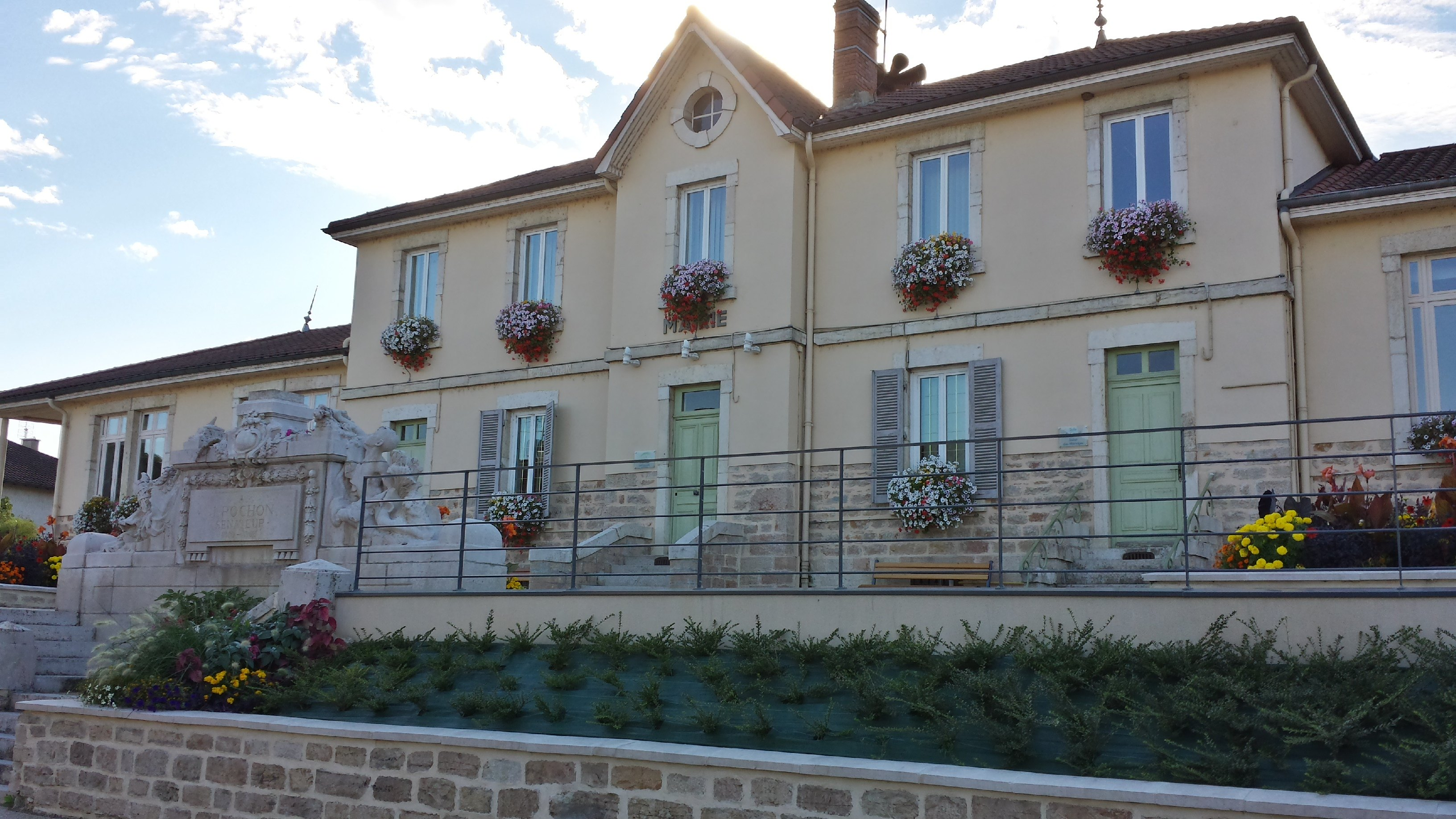
- Town hall
- Location of Marboz
- Location within France Location within Auvergne-Rhône-Alpes
- Coordinates: 46°20′33″N 5°15′30″E
- Country: France
- Region: Auvergne-Rhône-Alpes
- Department: Ain
- Arrondissement: Bourg-en-Bresse
- Canton: Saint-Étienne-du-Bois
- Intercommunality: CA Bassin de Bourg-en-Bresse

Government
  - Mayor (2026–32): Christelle Moiraud
- Area^{1}: 40.14 km^{2} (15.50 sq mi)
- Elevation: 217 m (712 ft)
- Highest elevation: 240 m (790 ft)
- Lowest elevation: 194 m (636 ft)
- Population (2023): 2,264
  - Density: 56.40/km^{2} (146.1/sq mi)
- Time zone: UTC+01:00 (CET)
  - Summer (DST): UTC+02:00 (CEST)
- INSEE/Postal code: 01232 /01851
- ^{1} French Land Register data, which excludes lakes, ponds, glaciers > 1 km^{2} (0.386 sq mi or 247 acres) and river estuaries.

Marboz (French pronunciation: [maʁbo]) is a commune in the Ain department in eastern France.

== Geography ==
The Sevron forms most of the commune's eastern border.

== Population ==
Historical population

Year	Pop.	±% p.a.
1793	2,973	—
1800	2,574	−2.04%
1806	2,502	−0.47%
1821	2,348	−0.42%
1831	2,330	−0.08%
1836	2,411	+0.69%
1841	2,664	+2.02%
1846	2,620	−0.33%
1851	2,580	−0.31%
1856	2,560	−0.16%
1861	2,507	−0.42%
1866	2,533	+0.21%
1872	2,556	+0.15%
1876	2,533	−0.23%
1881	2,550	+0.13%
1886	2,614	+0.50%
1891	2,602	−0.09%
1896	2,558	−0.34%
1901	2,541	−0.13%

Year	Pop.	±% p.a.
1906	2,556	+0.12%
1911	2,575	+0.15%
1921	2,201	−1.56%
1926	2,201	+0.00%
1931	2,060	−1.32%
1936	2,052	−0.08%
1946	2,010	−0.21%
1954	1,855	−1.00%
1962	1,733	−0.85%
1968	1,680	−0.52%
1975	1,701	+0.18%
1982	1,926	+1.79%
1990	2,026	+0.63%
1999	2,164	+0.73%
2007	2,176	+0.07%
2012	2,208	+0.29%
2017	2,244	+0.32%
2023	2,264	+0.15%

Source: EHESS and INSEE (1968-2023)

== See also ==
- Communes of the Ain department
