= Maizery =

Commune in Moselle, France

- Part of Colligny-Maizery
- Coat of arms
- Location of Maizery
- Location within France Location within Grand Est
- Coordinates: 49°06′23″N 6°20′12″E
- Country: France
- Region: Grand Est
- Department: Moselle
- Arrondissement: Metz
- Canton: Le Pays Messin
- Commune: Colligny-Maizery
- Area^{1}: 3.16 km^{2} (1.22 sq mi)
- Elevation: 240 m (790 ft)
- Highest elevation: 291 m (955 ft)
- Lowest elevation: 230 m (750 ft)
- Population (2022): 169
  - Density: 53.5/km^{2} (139/sq mi)
- Time zone: UTC+01:00 (CET)
  - Summer (DST): UTC+02:00 (CEST)
- Postal code: 57530
- ^{1} French Land Register data, which excludes lakes, ponds, glaciers > 1 km^{2} (0.386 sq mi or 247 acres) and river estuaries.

Maizery (French pronunciation: [mɛzʁi]; German: Macheringen) is a former commune in the Moselle department in north-eastern France. On 1 June 2016, it was merged into the new commune of Colligny-Maizery. Its population was 169 in 2022.

== See also ==
- Communes of the Moselle department
