= Villemotier =

Commune in Auvergne-Rhône-Alpes, France

- Commune
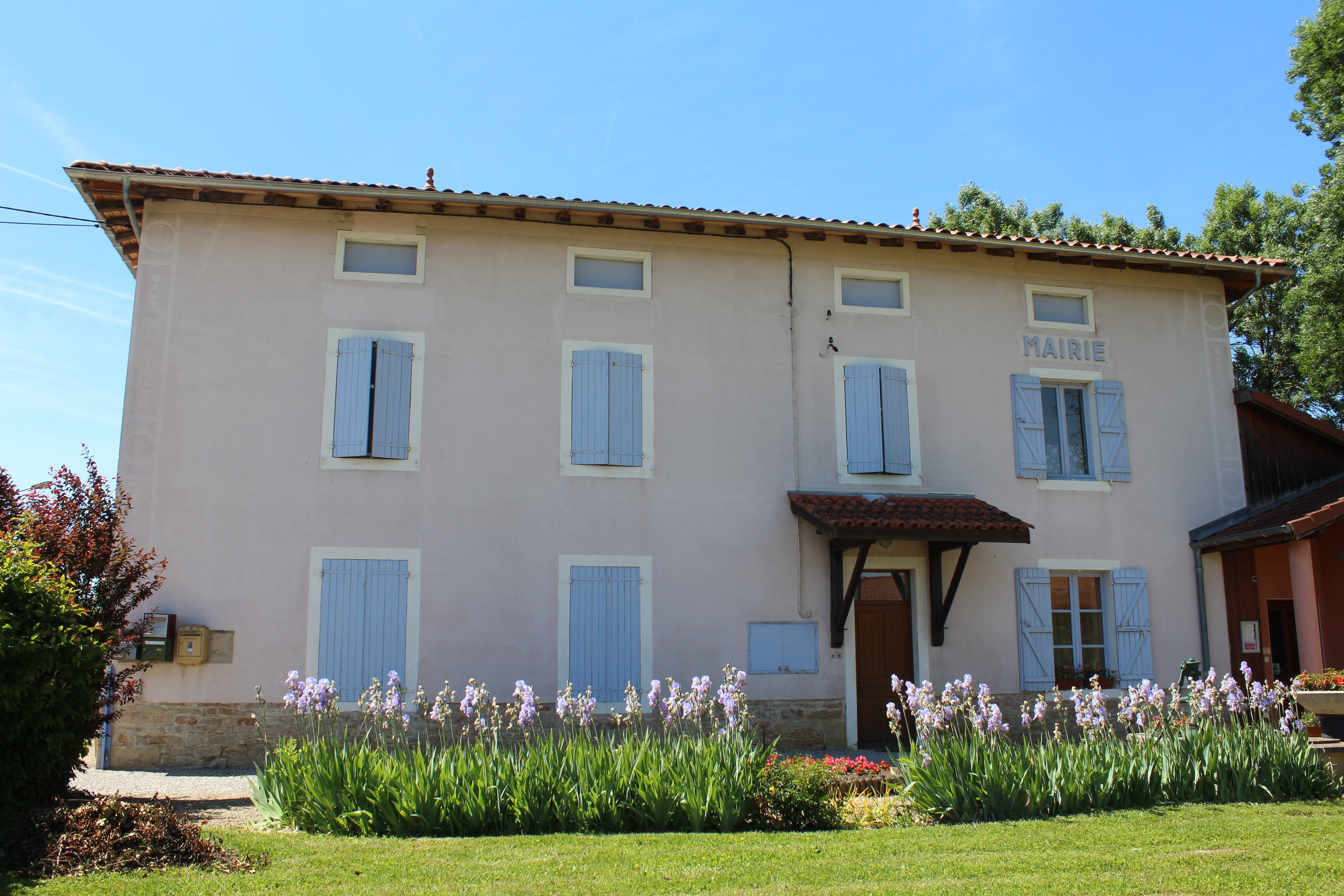
- Town hall
- Location of Villemotier
- Location within France Location within Auvergne-Rhône-Alpes
- Coordinates: 46°20′46″N 5°19′16″E
- Country: France
- Region: Auvergne-Rhône-Alpes
- Department: Ain
- Arrondissement: Bourg-en-Bresse
- Canton: Saint-Étienne-du-Bois
- Intercommunality: CA Bassin de Bourg-en-Bresse

Government
  - Mayor (2026–32): Franck Christophe Guyard
- Area^{1}: 13.86 km^{2} (5.35 sq mi)
- Elevation: 219 m (719 ft)
- Highest elevation: 261 m (856 ft)
- Lowest elevation: 197 m (646 ft)
- Population (2023): 612
  - Density: 44.2/km^{2} (114/sq mi)
- Time zone: UTC+01:00 (CET)
  - Summer (DST): UTC+02:00 (CEST)
- INSEE/Postal code: 01445 /01270
- ^{1} French Land Register data, which excludes lakes, ponds, glaciers > 1 km^{2} (0.386 sq mi or 247 acres) and river estuaries.

Villemotier (French pronunciation: [vilmɔtje]; Arpitan: Lamotiér) is a commune in the Ain department in eastern France.

== Geography ==
The Solnan forms parts of the commune's eastern and western borders; it flows southwest through the eastern part of the commune and north through its middle.

== Population ==
Historical population
Year	Pop.	±% p.a.
1968	403	—
1975	372	−1.14%
1982	384	+0.45%
1990	419	+1.10%
1999	455	+0.92%
2007	565	+2.74%
2012	644	+2.65%
2017	656	+0.37%
2023	612	−1.15%
Source: INSEE

== See also ==
- Communes of the Ain department
