= Cologna, Graubünden =

- town
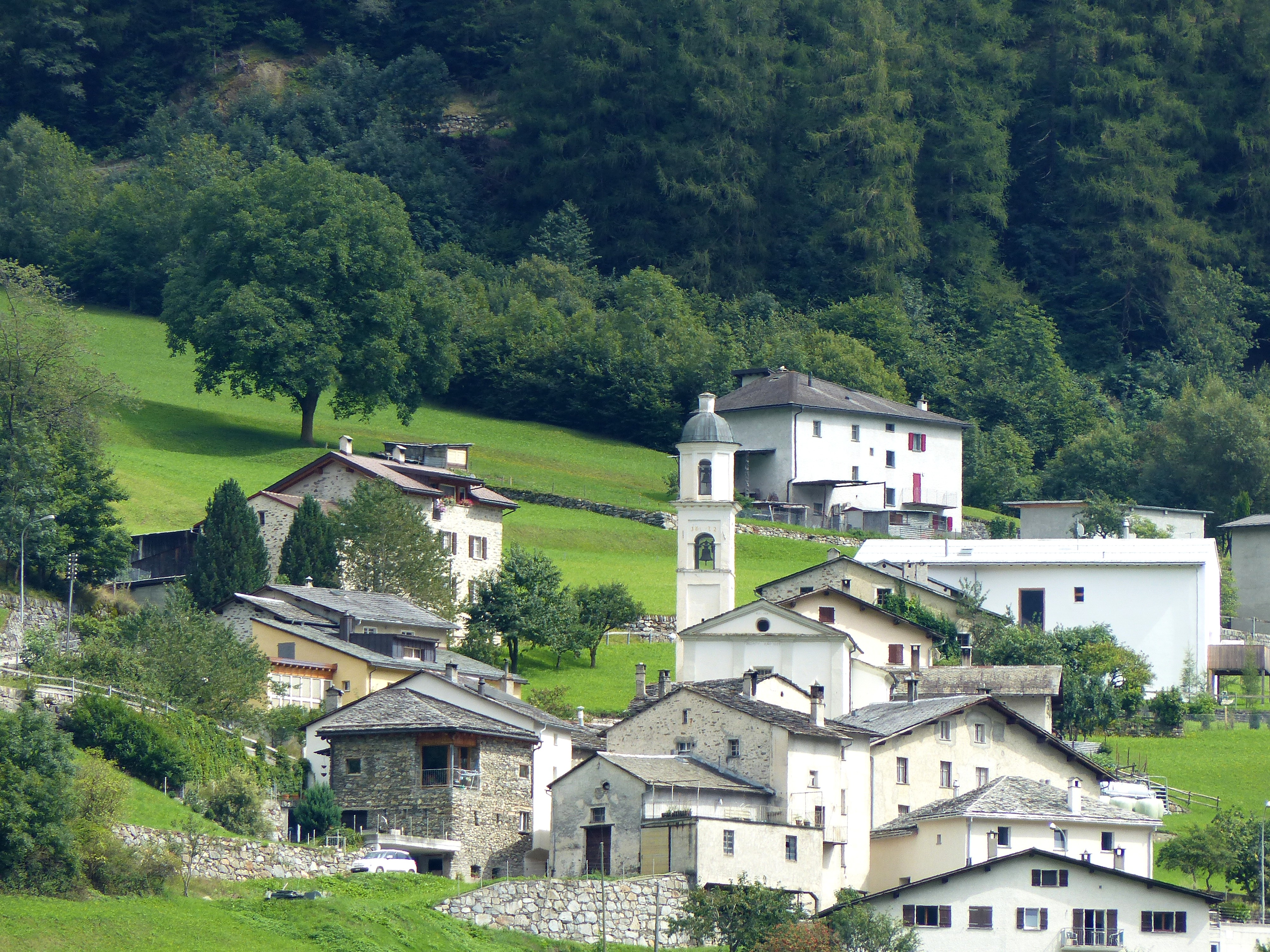
- Interactive map of Cologna, Graubünden
- Coordinates: 46°19′09″N 10°04′02″E
- Country: Switzerland

Cologna is a village in the Val Poschiavo in the canton of Graubünden, Switzerland. It lies at 1,090 metres (3,580 ft) above sea level and is in the municipality of Poschiavo, some 1.5 kilometres (0.93 mi) south-east of the village of the same name.
