= Salavre =

Commune in Auvergne-Rhône-Alpes, France

- Commune
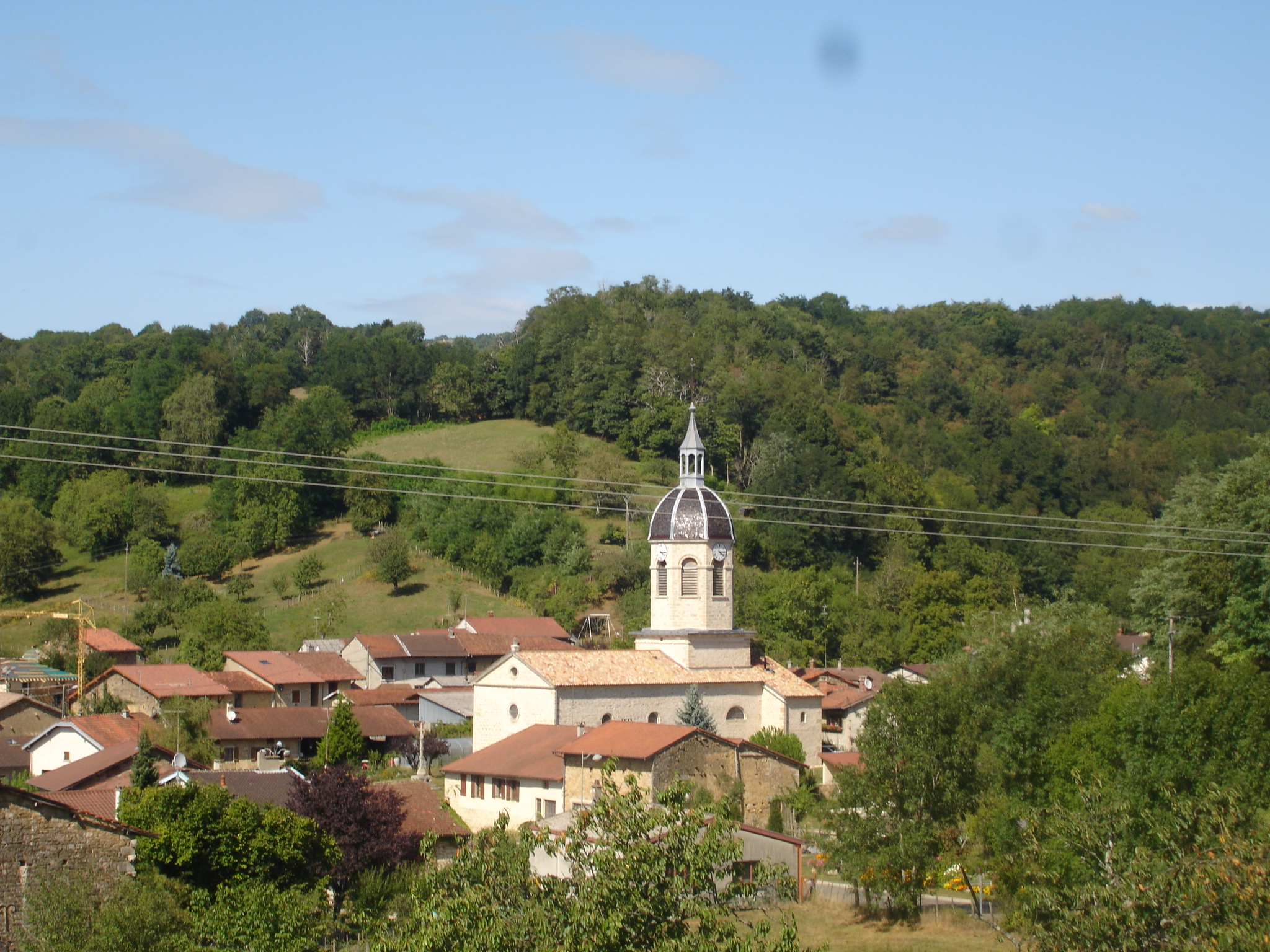
- Location of Salavre
- Location within France Location within Auvergne-Rhône-Alpes
- Coordinates: 46°21′50″N 5°20′46″E
- Country: France
- Region: Auvergne-Rhône-Alpes
- Department: Ain
- Arrondissement: Bourg-en-Bresse
- Canton: Saint-Étienne-du-Bois
- Intercommunality: CA Bassin de Bourg-en-Bresse

Government
  - Mayor (2026–32): Jacques Féaud
- Area^{1}: 7.77 km^{2} (3.00 sq mi)
- Elevation: 318 m (1,043 ft)
- Highest elevation: 561 m (1,841 ft)
- Lowest elevation: 203 m (666 ft)
- Population (2023): 306
  - Density: 39.4/km^{2} (102/sq mi)
- Time zone: UTC+01:00 (CET)
  - Summer (DST): UTC+02:00 (CEST)
- INSEE/Postal code: 01391 /01270
- ^{1} French Land Register data, which excludes lakes, ponds, glaciers > 1 km^{2} (0.386 sq mi or 247 acres) and river estuaries.

Salavre (French pronunciation: [salavʁ]) is a commune in the Ain department in eastern France.

== Geography ==
It is located about 15 km (9.3 mi) north of Bourg-en-Bresse and 40 km (25 mi) south of Lons-le-Saunier. The village lies on a small river, known as le Bief Laval, a tributary of the Solnan.

The Solnan forms part of the commune's western border.

== Population ==
Historical population
| Year | Pop. | ±% p.a. |
|---|---|---|
| 1968 | 288 | — |
| 1975 | 238 | −2.69% |
| 1982 | 218 | −1.25% |
| 1990 | 246 | +1.52% |
| 1999 | 285 | +1.65% |
| 2007 | 282 | −0.13% |
| 2012 | 289 | +0.49% |
| 2017 | 272 | −1.21% |
| 2023 | 306 | +1.98% |
Source: INSEE

== See also ==
- Communes of the Ain department
