= Coligny, Ain =

Commune in Auvergne-Rhône-Alpes, France

Coligny
- Commune
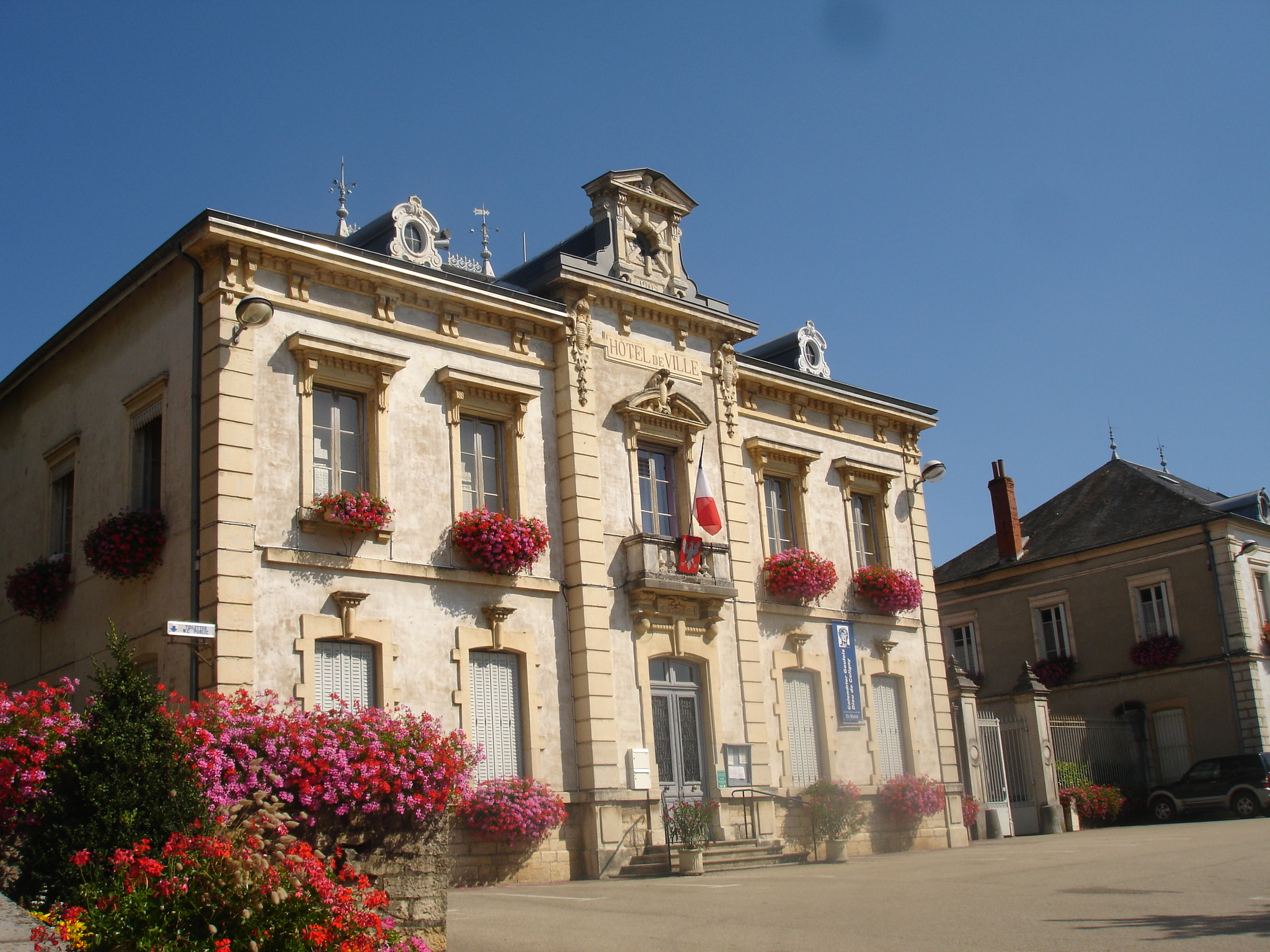
- Town hall

- Coat of arms
- Location of Coligny
- Location within France Location within Auvergne-Rhône-Alpes
- Coordinates: 46°22′59″N 5°20′46″E
- Country: France
- Region: Auvergne-Rhône-Alpes
- Department: Ain
- Arrondissement: Bourg-en-Bresse
- Canton: Saint-Étienne-du-Bois
- Intercommunality: Bassin de Bourg-en-Bresse

Government
  - Mayor (2026–32): Bruno Raffin
- Area^{1}: 16.87 km^{2} (6.51 sq mi)
- Elevation: 293 m (961 ft)
- Highest elevation: 575 m (1,886 ft)
- Lowest elevation: 199 m (653 ft)
- Population (2023): 1,360
  - Density: 80.6/km^{2} (209/sq mi)
- Time zone: UTC+01:00 (CET)
  - Summer (DST): UTC+02:00 (CEST)
- INSEE/Postal code: 01108 /01270
- ^{1} French Land Register data, which excludes lakes, ponds, glaciers > 1 km^{2} (0.386 sq mi or 247 acres) and river estuaries.

Coligny (French pronunciation: [kɔliɲi]; Arpitan: Colignê) is a commune in the Ain department in eastern France.

== Geography ==
The commune lies near Bourg-en-Bresse; the Solnan forms its southwestern border.

== Population ==
Historical population
Year	Pop.	±% p.a.
1968	1,111	—
1975	1,077	−0.44%
1982	1,132	+0.71%
1990	1,117	−0.17%
1999	1,091	−0.26%
2007	1,147	+0.63%
2012	1,166	+0.33%
2017	1,181	+0.26%
2023	1,360	+2.38%
Source: INSEE

== Personalities ==
Coligny was the birthplace of Joseph Darnand (1897–1945), a French pro-Nazi traitor and leader of the Vichy French Milice.

Lexicographer and poet Marie-Marguerite Brun (1713–1794) was born in Coligny.

== Gaulish background ==
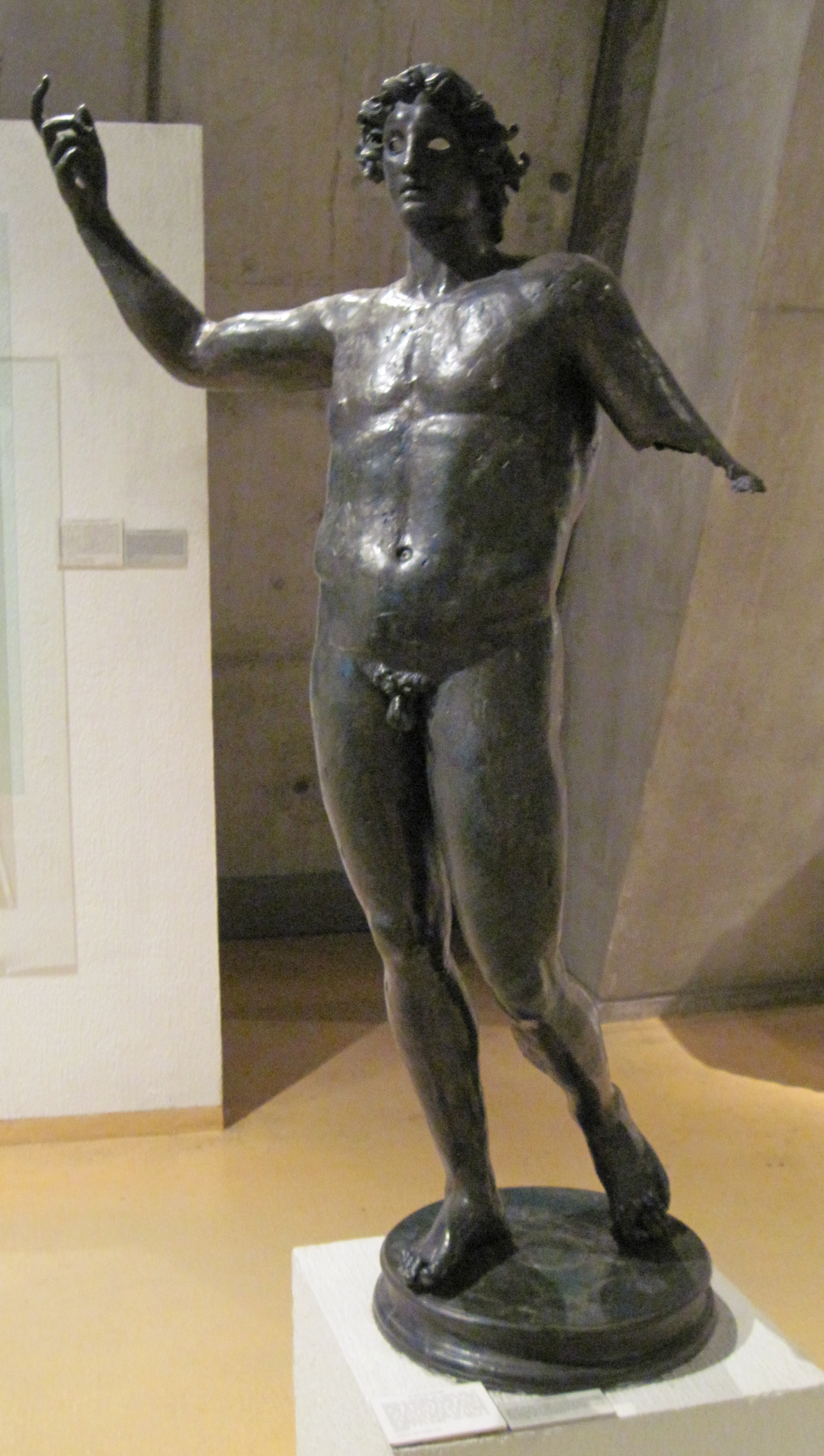
The god of Coligny.

Coligny, called is famed for the Coligny calendar. This lunisolar calendar, which dates from second-century Roman Gaul, has been key in the understanding of the knowledge of astronomy among the Gauls and also supplied interesting information about the Gaulish language, such as the names of months and the words for "lucky" and "unlucky." It was an engraved bronze tablet originally discovered as fragments in 1897. It is written in the Latin alphabet and it represents a five-year cycle composed of three years having twelve lunar months and two years (the first and third) having thirteen lunar months.

At the end of the 19th century, a bronze statue was discovered in the town, christened the Dieu de Coligny "God of Coligny."

== See also ==
- Communes of the Ain department
