= Colon =

Colon commonly refers to:

- Colon (punctuation) (:), a punctuation mark
- Colon (anatomy), a major part of the large intestine
  - Common inaccurate term for the entire large intestine

Colon may also refer to:

== Places ==
- Colon, Michigan, US
- Colon, Nebraska, US
- Colon, North Carolina, US
- Colon Township, Michigan, US
- Kowloon, Hong Kong, spelled "Colon" in older books
- Colón Department (Honduras), department of Honduras
- Colón, Panama in:
  - Colón Province, Panama
- Colón, Putumayo in Colombia
- Colón, Cuba in Cuba
- Colón, Venezuela in Venezuela
- Colon Street, Cebu City, Philippines

== People and fictional characters ==
- Colon (surname)
- Colón (surname)
- Colon (singer), Japanese singer
- Colons, another term for Pieds-Noirs (European settlers in French Algeria)

== Other uses ==
- Colon (letter), a colon-like character used as an alphabetic letter
- Colon (rhetoric), a clause which is grammatically, but not logically, complete
- Colon (CONFIG.SYS directive), usage of :label in DR DOS configuration files
- Colon (beetle), a genus of beetles in the family Leiodidae
- Colon (grape), a French wine grape
- Colon classification, a library classification system
- Costa Rican colón, currency of Costa Rica
- SS Arawa, ocean liner, ship, named Colon when in Spanish service 1895-1898

== See also ==
- Colón (disambiguation)
- Cologne (disambiguation)
- Colonus (person) (in Ancient Rome)
- Columbus (disambiguation)
- Column (disambiguation)
- Isocolon
- Kolon (disambiguation)
- Koron (disambiguation)
- The Colóns (disambiguation)
