= Koron =

Koron may refer to:

- Koron (Cappadocia), now in Turkey
- Koron (music), in Persian traditional music

== See also ==
- Karun, Hormozgan or Korūn, Iran
- Koroni or Corone, Greece
- Coron (disambiguation)
- Colon (disambiguation)
- Colón (disambiguation)
- Kolon (disambiguation)
