= Katipunan (disambiguation) =

The Katipunan was a Philippine revolutionary organization.

Katipunan may also refer to:

- Katipunan, Zamboanga del Norte, municipality in the Philippine province of Zamboanga del Norte
- Katipunan station, a train station in Manila LRT Line 2
- Katipunan Avenue, street in Quezon City
- Katipunan Street, street in Cebu City
- Katipunan, also known as Loyola Heights, a barangay in Quezon City
- Katipunan (TV series), a 2013 Philippine television series
