= Liar's Poker: The Great Powers, Yugoslavia and the Wars of the Future =

1998 book by Michel Collon

- Author: Michel Collon
- Original title: Poker menteur : les grandes puissances, la Yougoslavie et les prochaines guerres)
- Language: French
- Publication date: 1998

Liar's Poker: The Great Powers, Yugoslavia and the Wars of the Future (French: Poker menteur : les grandes puissances, la Yougoslavie et les prochaines guerres) is a 1998 book by Michel Collon. It was originally written in French and was later translated to English. It speculates on the long-term goals of the United States and other great powers, and accuses the government and the media of conducting a campaign of organized disinformation.
