= Colon (surname) =

Colon is a surname, and may refer to:

- Augie Colon (1927–2004), American percussionist
- Delfin Colon (born 1969), Puerto Rican baseball umpire
- Filiberto Colon (born 1964), Puerto Rican swimmer
- Gilles Colon (born 1981), Canadian football player
- Harry Colon (born 1969), American football player
- Jacques Colon (born 1944), Belgian sports shooter
- Javier Colon (born 1978), American singer-songwriter
- Joe Colon (wrestler) (born 1991), American wrestler
- Johnny Colon, American musician
- José María Colon
- Luis Diaz Colon (born 1952), Puerto Rican politician
- Nancy Leftenant-Colon (1920–2025), American nurse
- Trystan Colon (born 1998), American football player
- Victor Colon (born 1972), Puerto Rican artistic gymnast
- Willie Colon (American football) (born 1983), American football player
- Chris Colon, American musician and member of Beatles tributes The Fab Four and 1964 the Tribute
- Evelyn Colon (1961–1976), formerly unidentified American murder victim; see Murder of Evelyn Colon
- Tyler Colon (born 1995), American singer-songwriter, stage name Tai Verdes

== Fictional characters ==
- Fred Colon, a fictional character in the Discworld universe

== See also ==
- Colón (surname)
- Collon (surname)
