= Collon (disambiguation) =

Collon is a village in Ireland. Collon may also refer to:

- Collon (surname)
- Mont Collon, mountain in the Swiss Alps
  - Col Collon, a mountain pass in the Alps between Italy and Switzerland
