= Kolon =

Kolon may refer to:

- Kolon Industries, a Korean company
- Kolon, Chad, a sub-prefecture of Chad

== See also ==
- Abba Kolon, a figure in Talmudic mythology
- Ali Kolon, 15th-century Songhai king
- Colon (disambiguation)
- Kollon, arcade puzzle game
- Kolong (disambiguation)
