= ; (disambiguation) =

The ; character is represented by 59 in ASCII and U+003B ; SEMICOLON in Unicode. It is used as:

- Semicolon, a punctuation mark
- Greek question mark
- Semicolon (EP), also stylized as ;

== See also ==
- Colon (disambiguation)
