= Collen (surname) =

Collen is a surname, and may refer to:

- Edwin Henry Hayter Collen (1843–1911), British Army officer in India
- Désiré Collen (born 1943), Belgian physician and chemist
- Henry Collen (1797–1879), portrait painter
- Lindsey Collen (born 1948), Mauritian novelist and activist
- Pieter Collen (born 1980), Belgian footballer
- Phil Collen (born 1957), English guitarist
- Tom Collen, basketball coach

See also

- Willink van Collenprijs (English: The Willink van Collen Award), Dutch art award named after Willink van Collen
