= Colón District =

Colón District may refer to:

- Colón District, Mora, in Mora Canton, San José Province, Costa Rica
- Colón District, Panama, in Colón Province, Panama

== See also ==
- Colón (disambiguation)
