= CITU =

CITU may stand for:

- Cebu Institute of Technology – University, educational institution in the Philippines
- Centre for Islamic Thought and Understanding (CITU), academic centre for Universiti Teknologi MARA, Malaysia
- The Centre of Indian Trade Unions
- CITU (Création Interactive Transdisciplinaire Universitaire) Lab, university laboratory for arts and new media of University of Paris VIII, France
