= Cebu Institute of Technology – University =

Private university in Cebu City, Philippines

- CIT-U Tops Again!
- Former name: Cebu Institute of Technology (CIT) (1946–2010)
- Motto: Virtus in Scientia et Tecnologia (Latin)
- Motto in English: Virtue in Science and Technology
- University Hymn: All Hail, Maroon and Gold!
- Type: Private, nonsectarian, research, co-educational basic and higher education institution
- Established: 1946; 80 years ago
- Founder: Nicolas G. Escario Sr.
- Chairman: Engr. Bernard Nicolas E. Villamor
- President: Engr. Bernard Nicolas E. Villamor
- Vice-president: John Gregory B. Escario (VP for Administration); Ma. Socorro E. Villamor (VP for Finance); Corazon Evangelista – Valencia (VP for Academic Affairs)
- Students: 20,000+ (A. Y. 2023–24)
- Location: Cebu City, Cebu, Philippines; 10°17′44″N 123°52′49″E
- Demonym: Technologians, Teknoys
- Colors: Maroon and Gold
- Nickname: Wildcats
- Sporting affiliations: CESAFI
- Website: www.cit.edu
- Location in the Visayas Location in the Philippines

The Cebu Institute of Technology – University (CIT University, or less often CIT-U, and colloquially CIT) is an autonomous, private, non-sectarian academic institution in Cebu City, Philippines. The university provides basic and higher education with a foundation in general and technological education. The university was known simply as Cebu Institute of Technology until 2010 when it has attained university status.

CIT-U is the first higher educational institution (HEI) in the Visayas and Mindanao classified as Category A (t). This places CIT-U as a mature teaching institution under the CHED-IQuAME framework. IQuAME is the Institutional Quality Assurance through Monitoring and Evaluation, a system of higher education quality assurance and classification.

CIT-U is one of only nine schools in the Philippines to be awarded by the Commission on Higher Education (CHED) as a Center of Excellence in Information Technology Education.

== History ==
The school was founded in 1946 by then-Cebu City mayor Nicolas Escario, along with United States-trained engineers Fidel C. Dagani, Amancio A. Alcordo, and Jose A. Cavan., with Escario serving as the school's first president. The school's board of trustees was then voted in shortly afterward, with Simplicio A. Lizares elected as CIT's first chairman of the board of trustees and Rodolfo T. Lizares as CIT's first Vice President.

Founded shortly after World War II, the school had the stated aim of helping the country rebuild by focusing on industries that were most needed at the time, which included architecture, civil engineering, mechanical and electrical engineering, among others.

The Cebu Institute of Technology formally opened in 1946, starting with 512 pioneering students enrolled in high school and college levels. It offered various degree programs in engineering and architecture, as well as vocational programs. Liberal Arts (1947), Pharmacy and Junior Normal programs (1948) and Education (1949) were subsequently offered as the school's first non-technical programs. The Vocational department was phased out in 1951 while the College of Commerce was opened in the same year. Two years later, in 1953, the Sanitary Engineering department started. To meet the demands of the growing society, other programs were offered such as Pre-medicine in 1957 and Secretarial in 1958.

Rodolfo Lizares, who served as CIT Vice-president, took over as president after the death of Nicolas Escario in 1958. Under the helm of Lizares, the Bachelor of Science in Mining Engineering was offered in 1960. In affiliation with Velez College, the pre-Nursing and Doctor of Medicine programs were also offered in the same year. Foreseeing the demands for STEM, the Bachelor of Science in Industrial Engineering was offered in 1968.

In 1965, a site along N. Bacalso Avenue was acquired, on which a modern four-storey building was built, initially occupied by the college graduating students in 1971. Gradually, the remaining colleges at the school's campus along C. Padilla Street were transferred to the new site. The new campus soon housed the administrative staff, college academic buildings, college library, engineering and science laboratories, and provides sprawling grounds for parking, athletics, and drill purposes. Towards the end of 1978, the school ventured into engaging in a multi-million-development plan with the Educational Project Implementing Task Force (EDPITAF) of the government. Through this program, CIT University became a foremost resource-based institution for engineering programs in the Visayas and Mindanao regions.

The demands from the electronics industry in the 1980s challenged the institution to offer the Bachelor of Science in Electronics and Communications Engineering program in 1983. Keeping abreast with the advancement of science and technology, special computer programs were offered in 1983 under the Computer Department. As the department grew, it was renamed the Department of Computer Studies with its innovative ladderized curricula. The department was given government recognition by the Department of Education, Culture and Sports (DECS) to operate its degree programs: Information and Computer Science, Computer Management, Computer Technology and Computer Engineering with their corresponding associate certificates.

In 1991, Gregorio L. Escario took over as the school's president following the death of Lizares, becoming the third president of the institution. Under his leadership, the Kindergarten school was opened together with the reopening of the Elementary Department in 1992. A modern three-storey building fully equipped with modern academic facilities now house the department.

The institution was deputized by the Commission on Higher Education (CHED) in 1999 to offer the expanded Tertiary Education Equivalency and Accreditation Program (ETEEAP). The following year, the school's Information Technology program was awarded with the Center of Excellence certificate, solidifying its status as one of Central Visayas' topnotch institutions.

In 2010, the school was granted university status by the Commission on Higher Education. The school was then renamed the Cebu Institute of Technology – University to reflect its new status.

In 2017, following the passing of Gregorio L. Escario, Bernard Nicolas E. Villamor took oath as the school's fourth president.

== Campus ==
The Cebu Institute of Technology – University currently has only one campus, located along N. Bacalso Avenue in Cebu City. The campus is also bounded by Tres de Abril Street on its back end. The campus hosts all of CIT-U's academic offerings, from nursery school to graduate studies. The N. Bacalso campus is the school's third location since its founding.

At the school's founding in 1946, it occupied two pre-fabricated structures along F. Ramos Street, Cebu City. Sometime during the 1950s, the school transferred to a bigger location located along C. Padilla Street, also within Cebu City, before transferring to its current location along N. Bacalso Avenue. CIT-U's second location is now home to the Don Carlos A. Gothong Memorial High School, a public secondary school.

=== Buildings ===
==== Don Rodolfo T. Lizares, Sr. Building ====
Opened in 1971, this building was the first to be built in the school's N. Bacalso campus. It is also known as the Main Building or the RTL Building. The building was renamed in 2018 to honor Rodolfo T. Lizares, Sr., the school's second president. It houses the following departments: College of Management, Business, and Accountancy; College of Arts, Sciences, and Education; College of Criminal Justice; Senior High School Department.

It is connected to the Dr. Nicolas G. Escario, Sr. Building on the third floor, and to the Don Simplicio A. Lizares Building (Junior High School Building) on the second, third, and fourth floors.

In the middle of the Don Rodolfo T. Lizares, Sr. Building is the Quadrangle, where many of the school's events are held.

Currently, the building is undergoing renovations on its fourth floor.

==== Dr. Nicolas G. Escario, Sr. Building ====
Also known as the Science and Technology Building or ST Building, it was inaugurated in 2002. The building hosts the College of Computer Studies and the College of Nursing and Allied Health Sciences, as well as the computer laboratories of the Senior High School department. It is connected to the Main Building via an elevated walkway connected between the third floors of both buildings. It was then named the Dr. Nicolas G. Escario, Sr. Building on December 6, 2018, more commonly known as the NGE Building by students.

==== Academic Building ====
Inaugurated in 2006, this building hosts the College of Engineering and Architecture.

==== Don Simplicio A. Lizares Building ====
Opened in 1999, the building was originally called the High School building. In 2018, it was renamed as the Don Simplicio A. Lizares Building, to honor the school's first Chairman of the Board of Trustees.

==== Gregorio L. Escario Building ====
Opened in 2021, the new 8-storey building is situated in front of the Academic Building. It is a multi-purpose building with lecture hall-style rooms, as well as general classrooms. It was named after the university's third president Gregorio L. Escario, and is commonly abbreviated as the GLE Building by students.

==== Elementary Building ====
Opened in 1992, the building hosts the school's nursery school, kindergarten, and elementary department. It also hosts a playground open to the school's younger students.

==== Allied Engineering Building ====
Situated behind the Main Building, these rooms are used mostly used for laboratory classes by the College of Engineering and Architecture.

==== CIT-U Gymnasium ====
Constructed in 2004, this air-conditioned gymnasium is located behind the Don Simplicio A. Lizares Building and is where events and ceremonies are held. PE classes and other recreational activities also occur here.

== Student Life ==
The students of CIT-U are called the Technologians, Teknoys, or Wildcats.

=== Events and traditions ===
==== Colors’ Day (August 26) ====
The Colors’ Day, held annually every August 26, celebrates the birth anniversary of the late President Rodolfo T. Lizares Sr. Appropriate ceremonies and activities participated in by the students, faculty, and members of the administration bring about a festive spirit of music, drama, dances, and intramurals, highlighted by the symbolic raising of the department colors.

==== Founder’s Day ====
The Founder's Day, held annually every December 6, commemorates the birth anniversary of the founder, Dr. Nicolas G. Escario Sr. Activities such as memorial lectures, academic exhibits, and cultural presentations, are held.

==== University Day ====
Formerly called 'College Day', the University Day celebrates the birth anniversary of the late Don Simplicio A. Lizares Sr., First Chairman of the board of trustees. Educational exhibits, lecture series, cultural presentations, fellowships, and athletic games culminate college and departmental achievements for the school year.

It is celebrated annually every March 3.

==== Conferment Day ====
The Conferment Day celebrates the day the Commission on Higher Education (CHED) created Commission En Banc Resolution No. 165-2010, which declared Cebu Institute of Technology's elevation to university status. Since then, the official name of the institution has become Cebu Institute of Technology – University.

The first Conferment Day was celebrated on July 7, 2011, and has since been celebrated annually.

==== Parangal ====
The Parangal English: Award is an annual tradition in CIT-U which recognizes the achievements of its students in the fields of academics, athletics, leadership, organizations, and the officers of the school's Supreme Student Government are recognized. It is usually held on the 2nd week of March.

==== Crowning of the King/Queen of Engineers ====
The top ranking Engineering student of the graduating class is awarded as the King/Queen of Engineers. The crowning of the King/Queen of Engineers is a yearly tradition of honoring the King or Queen of Engineers together with his/her parents. The members of his/her court are engineering students who will also be graduating with academic honors.

This activity is spearheaded by the College of Engineering and Architecture in cooperation with the Office of Admissions and Scholarships. It is usually held on the 2nd week of March, a day after the Parangal.

=== Student organizations ===
==== Student government ====
The CIT-U Supreme Student Government is the highest governing student organization in the college department.

It has an executive department in which the President, Vice President, and Secretary General are elected by the entire student body. Along with it are officers appointed by the President to different posts and commissions with the consent of the Commission on Appointments. Its legislative department is composed of elected departmental and collegiate representatives whose number is determined by the Commission on Elections based on the student population of each department and college. The judiciary is only established when there is a complaint on any violation on the student government's constitution, law, policies, executive orders, or relations and any petition to compel legislative or executive action pertaining to students’ rights. It shall be composed of a Chief Justice who shall preside over all sessions of the court and six Associate Justices.

Since 2015, there are two student political parties that compete in every student government elections namely, the Students in Action for Values and Empowerment (SAVE) Party and the Union of Nation-builders and Innovators for Transparency, Empowerment, and Development (UNITED) Party.

==== Student publication ====
The Technologian, formerly known as The Technologian Student Press (TTSP), is the school's official student publication.

=== Athletics ===
CIT-U is a founding member of the Cebu Schools Athletic Foundation, Inc. (CESAFI), which was founded in 2001. Before that, the school has also participated in the Cebu Amateur Athletic Association (CAAA) and the Cebu Collegiate Athletic Association (CCAA), which the CESAFI replaced.

The school's college (seniors) sports teams are nicknamed the Wildcats. The high school (juniors) teams, meanwhile, are called the Wildkittens.
