= Tres de Abril Street =

Street in Cebu City, Philippines

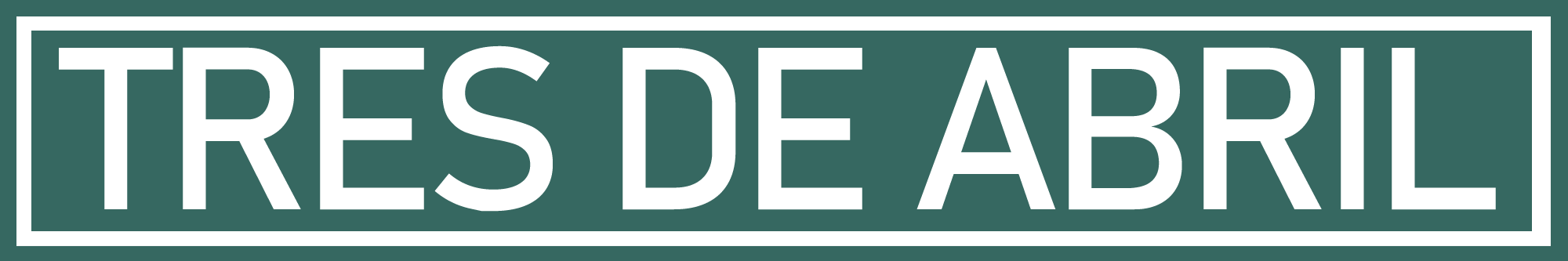
- Native name: Dalan Tres de Abril (Cebuano)
- Namesake: Battle of Tres de Abril
- Length: 3.01 km (1.87 mi)
- Location: Cebu City, Philippines
- From: Spolarium Street in Barangay Pasil
- Major junctions: C. Padilla Street; Sanciangko Street/Lakandula Street; V. Rama Avenue; N. Bacalso Avenue
- To: F. Llamas Street in Barangay Punta Princesa

Tres de Abril Street (Cebuano: Dalan Tres de Abril) is a national tertiary road in Cebu City, Philippines. It commences at Spolarium Street in Barangay Pasil which connects Barangay Ermita through the Forbes Bridge, passes through the junctions of C. Padilla Street and N. Bacalso Avenue, and ends at the junction of F. Llamas Street in Barangay Punta Princesa. It was formerly considered as a national secondary road under Executive Order No. 113 issued by President Ramon Magsaysay on May 2, 1955.

The street is named after the Battle of Tres de Abril, an uprising led by Leon Kilat that happened on April 3, 1898 as part of the Philippine Revolution against the Spaniards.

== Route description ==
The street begins as a one-way lane at Spolarium Street in Barangay Pasil and passes through the south bank of the Guadalupe River in Barangay Pahina San Nicolas. Upon reaching the junction of C. Padilla Street, it then proceeds as a short two-way lane beside the Pahina San Nicolas Barangay Hall and reverts into one-way upon reaching B. Aranas Street until the intersection of Sanciangko and Lakandula streets. It then becomes a two-way lane and passes through the Taboan Public Market in Barangay San Nicolas Proper which is known for its dried fish. It curves northeast past T. Abella Street and curves northwest leading to the junction of V. Rama Avenue where the National Historical Commission of the Philippines (NHCP) historical marker of the Battle of Tres de Abril is located. It once again becomes a one-way lane as it passes through the Adventist Hospital – Cebu and Carlock Street until it reaches the junction of N. Bacalso Avenue. However, it becomes inaccessible heading towards Barangay Labangon as it becomes a dedicated one-way lane for vehicles coming from A. Lopez and Katipunan streets, and from the other end of Tres de Abril Street where it finally reverts into a two-way lane. Before it heads to the boundary of Barangay Labangon with Barangay Punta Princesa, it passes through the junction of La Tresas Street, a one-way street for vehicles coming from N. Bacalso Avenue, goes on to the back gate of Cebu Institute of Technology – University and the junction of Salvador Street. As it reaches the small bridge which spans the Arrabal River, it then enters Barangay Punta Princesa passing through several residential areas and F. Pacaña Street, which also connects to Katipunan Street in Barangay Tisa. It then curves northwest passing through Little Angels Montessori School, Church Of Jesus Christ Of Latter-Day Saints, Punta Princesa Barangay Hall and the barangay's elementary and night high school. The street ends at the junction of F. Llamas and E. Sabellano streets where the Archdiocesan Shrine of Our Lady of Lourdes is located.

== Landmarks ==
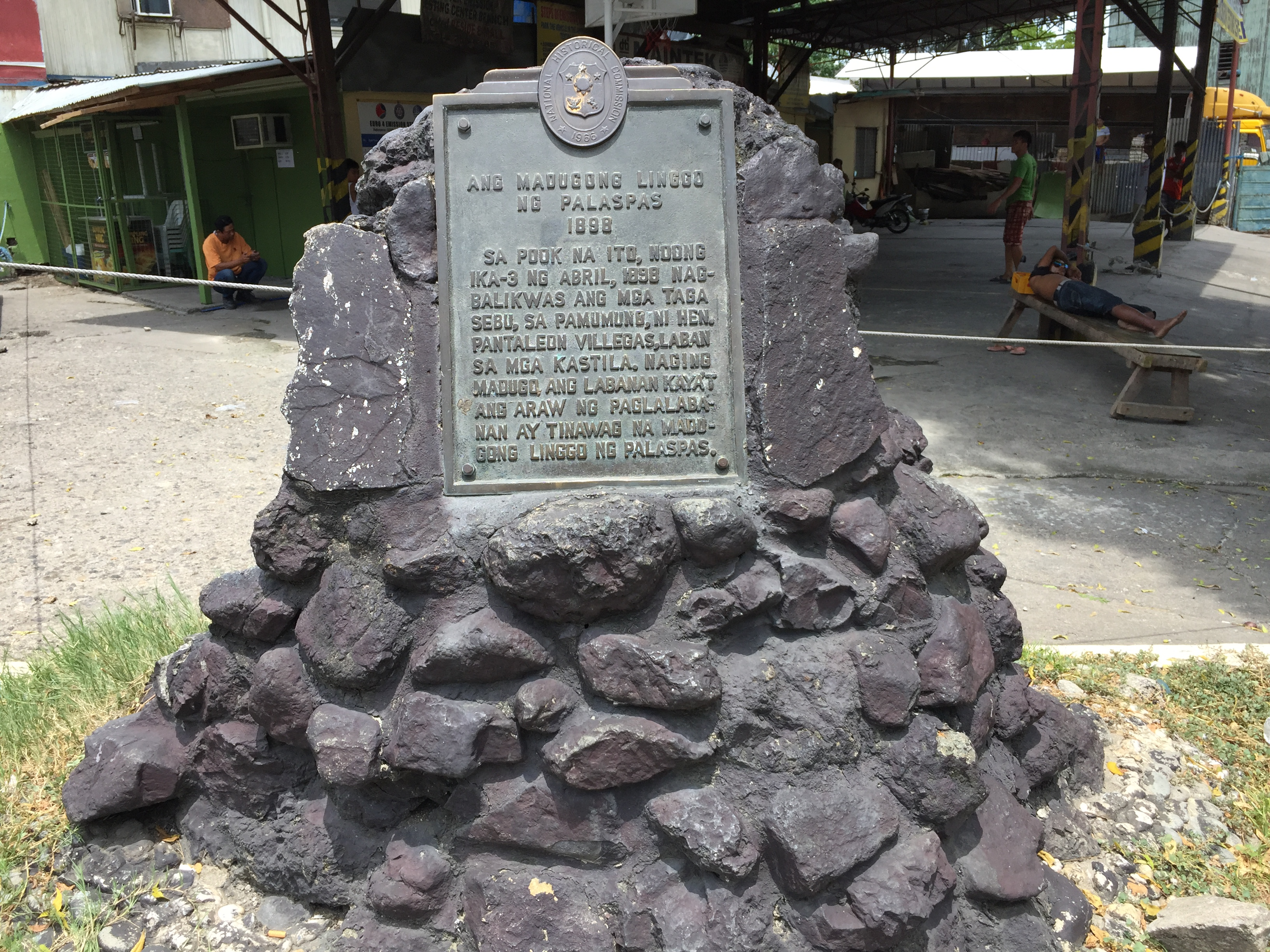
The NHCP historical marker of the Battle of Tres de Abril located at the intersection of Tres de Abril Street and V. Rama Avenue

- Taboan Public Market
- Adventist Hospital – Cebu (formerly H. W. Miller Memorial Sanitarium and Hospital)
- Tres de Abril Historical Marker
- Tres de Abril Monument
- Marianne Childhood Education Center
- Cebu Institute of Technology – University (Back gate)
- Little Angels Montessori School
- Church of Jesus Christ of Latter-Day Saints
- Punta Princesa Barangay Hall
- Punta Princesa Elementary School
- Punta Princesa National High School (Night)

== Connecting streets ==
- Spolarium Street
- Magallanes Street
- Espelita Street
- A. Borres Street
- C. Padilla Street
- B. Aranas Street
- Lakandula Street
- Sanciangko Street
- T. Abella Street
- V. Rama Avenue
- Carlock Street
- N. Bacalso Avenue
- A. Lopez Street
- La Tresas Street
- Salvador Street
- F. Pacaña Street
