= Kulung =

Kulung may refer to:

- Kulung people, an ethnic group of Nepal
- Kulung language (Nepal), a Sino-Tibetan language of Nepal
- Kulung language (Chad), a Chadic language of Chad
- Kulung language (West Chadic), a Chadic language of Nigeria
- Kulung language (Jarawan), a Bantoid language of Nigeria

== See also ==
- Kolong (disambiguation)
