= Colón (surname) =

Colón is a Spanish surname, comparable to the Italian and Portuguese Colombo, or English surname Columbus. Notable people with the surname include:

- Alba Colón (born 1968), American automotive engineer and racing executive
- Bartolo Colón (born 1973), Dominican baseball pitcher
- Carlos Colón, musician, member of The Deadlines
- Carlos Colón (born 1948), Puerto Rican wrestler
- Carly Colón (born 1979), Puerto Rican wrestler, son of Carlos Colón Sr.
- Christian Colón (born 1989), Puerto Rican baseball infielder
- Cristóbal Colón, the Spanish language name for the Italian explorer Christopher Columbus (1451–1506)
- Eddie Colón (born 1982), Puerto Rican wrestler, son of Carlos Colón Sr.
- Ernie Colón (1931–2019), American comics artist, born in Puerto Rico
- Jenniffer González-Colón (born 1976), Puerto Rican politician
- Jesús Colón (1901–1974), Puerto Rican writer and politician
- Kristiana Rae Colón (born 1986), American poet and playwright
- Orlando Colón (born 1982), Puerto Rican wrestler, nephew of Carlos Colón Sr.
- Willie Colón (1950–2026), American salsa musician and social activist

== See also ==
- Colón (disambiguation)
- Colon (disambiguation)
