= F. Llamas Street =

Street in Cebu City, Philippines

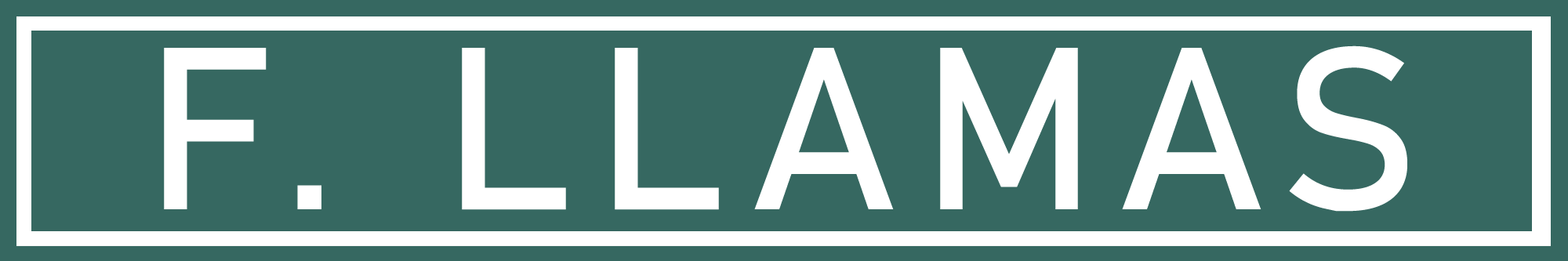
- Calle de Fernando Llamas (Spanish)
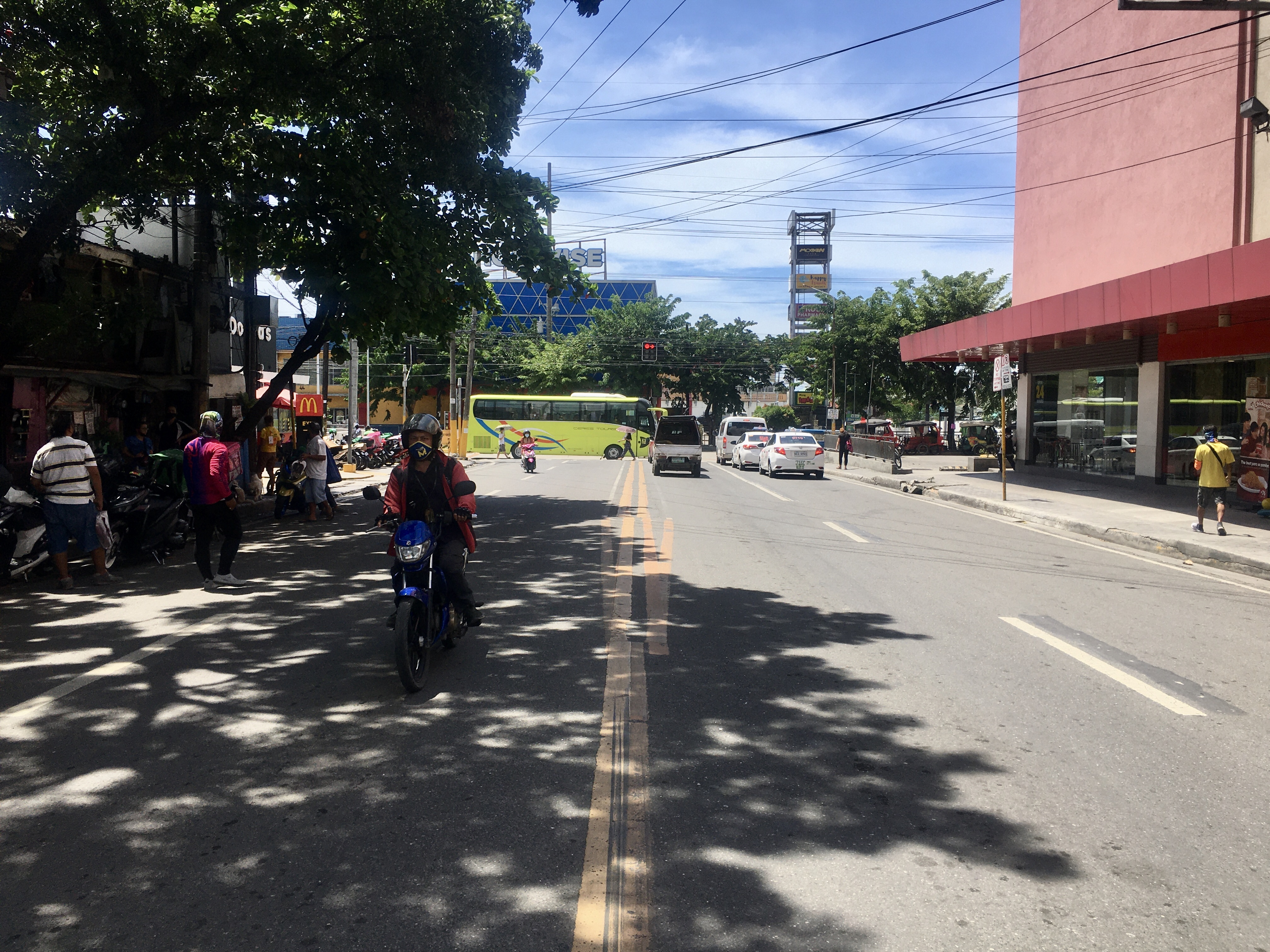
- End point of F. Llamas Street, Cebu City heading towards N. Bacalso Avenue
- Interactive map of F. Llamas Street
- Native name: Dalan F. Llamas (Cebuano)
- Namesake: Francisco Llamas Fernández
- Length: 1.38 km (0.86 mi); Based on DPWH Atlas 2019
- Location: Cebu City, Cebu, Philippines
- From: N. Bacalso Avenue in Barangay Basak San Nicolas
- Major junctions: Tres de Abril Street/E. Sabellano Street
- To: Katipunan Street in Barangay Tisa

F. Llamas Street (Cebuano: Dalan F. Llamas) is a national tertiary road in Cebu City, Cebu, Philippines. It commences at N. Bacalso Avenue in Barangay Basak San Nicolas, passes through the junction of Tres de Abril and E. Sabellano streets and ends at the junction of Katipunan Street in Barangay Tisa. It was formerly considered as a "national aid" city road under Executive Order No. 113 issued by President Ramon Magsaysay on May 2, 1955.

The street is named after Francisco Llamas, a Cebuano revolutionary who was a member of Cebu's Katipunan led by Leon Kilat and whose house was sometimes used as the group's meeting place.

== Route description ==
The street begins at N. Bacalso Avenue in Barangay Basak San Nicolas beside Super Metro Basak, passes along the junction of G. Elorde Street (formerly known as Ganciang Street) which divides the said barangay with Barangay Punta Princesa and proceeds towards the Archdiocesan Shrine of Our Lady of Lourdes. Upon reaching the junction of E. Sabellano Street, which is an alternative road for passengers going to south district barangays, and Tres de Abril Street, it goes on passing through several commercial and residential establishments before it reaches Barangay Tisa by passing through a small bridge which spans the Kinalumsan River. It then crosses the junction of Cabarrubias and F. Caburnay streets, curves northwest along Gaisano Capital Tisa and curves northeast as it reaches the Tisa Barangay hall. The street ends at the junction of Katipunan Street near where most of the barangay's well-known siomai and other food stores are located.

== Landmarks ==
- Super Metro Basak
- Archdiocesan Shrine of Our Lady of Lourdes
- Lourdes Kindergarten School
- Metro Fresh 'N Easy Punta
- Tisa II Elementary School
- Gaisano Capital Tisa
- Tisa National High School (Day & Night)
- Tisa Barangay Hall

== Connecting streets ==
- G. Elorde Street
- Tres de Abril Street
- E. Sabellano Street
- Manggahan Road
- Buhisan Road
- Taurus Street
- Pisces Street
- G. Osmeña Street
- Cabarrubias Street
- F. Caburnay Street

== Gallery ==
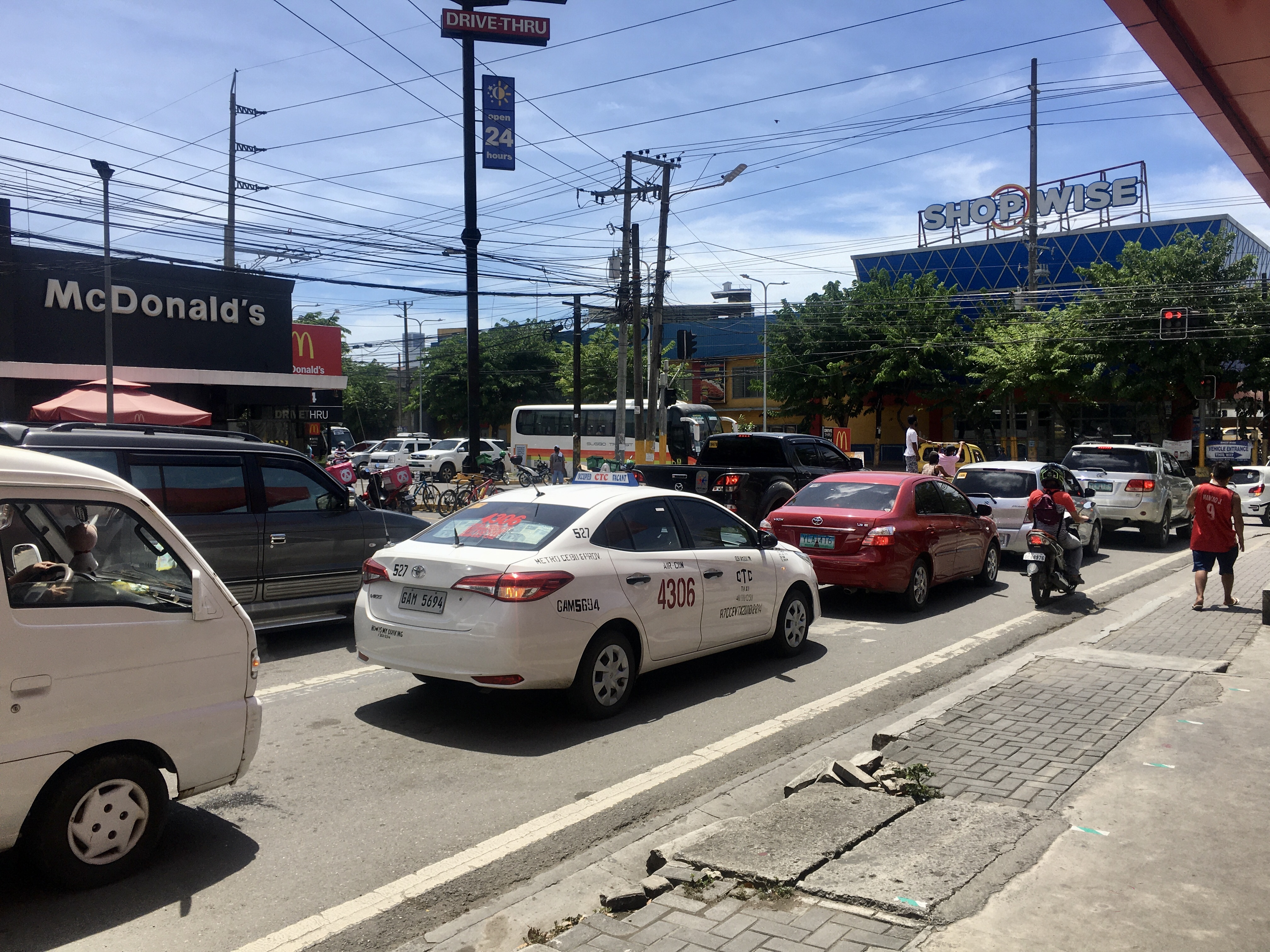
Vehicles on F. Llamas Street heading towards N. Bacalso Avenue

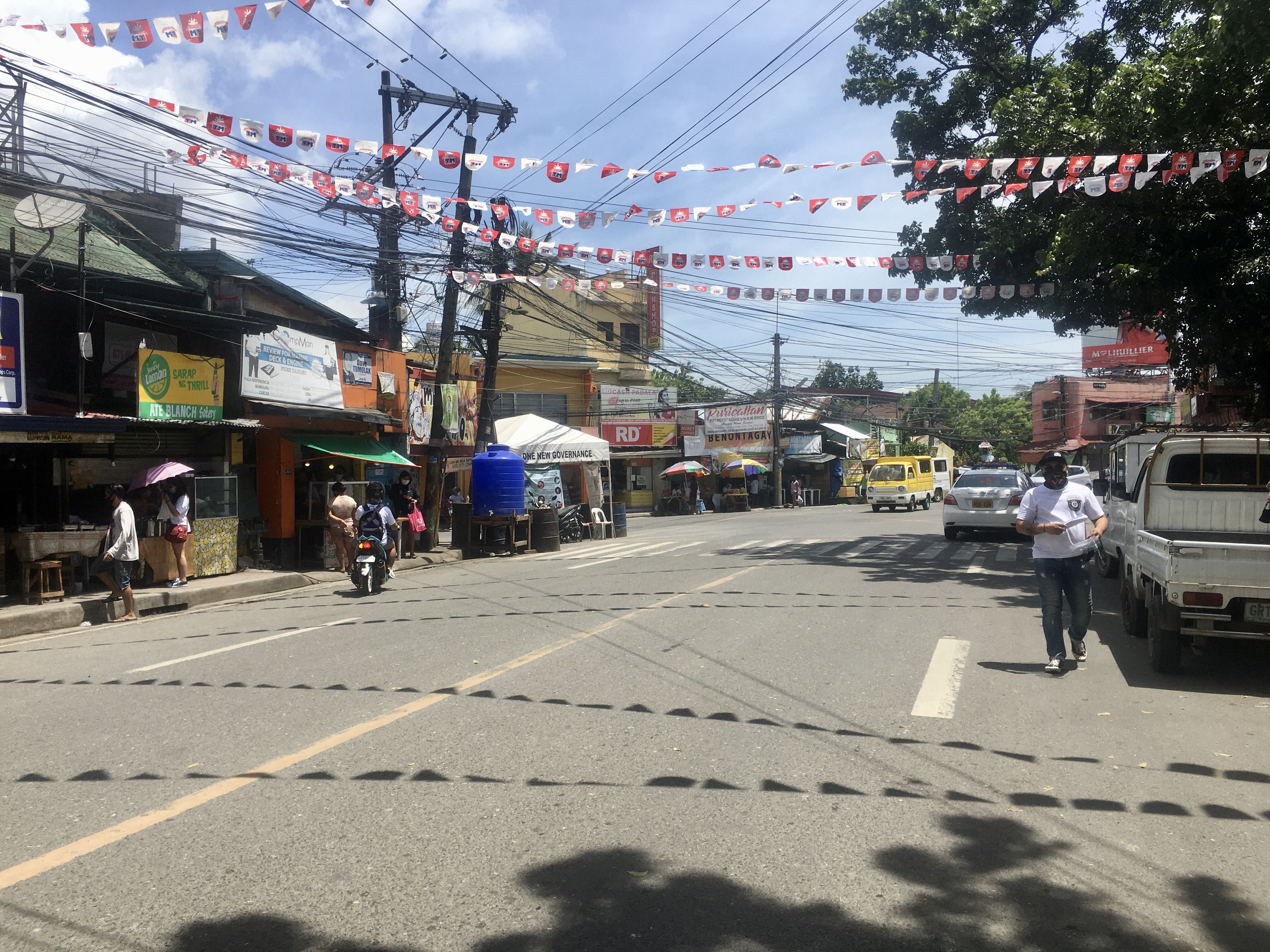
End point of F. Llamas Street heading towards Katipunan Street

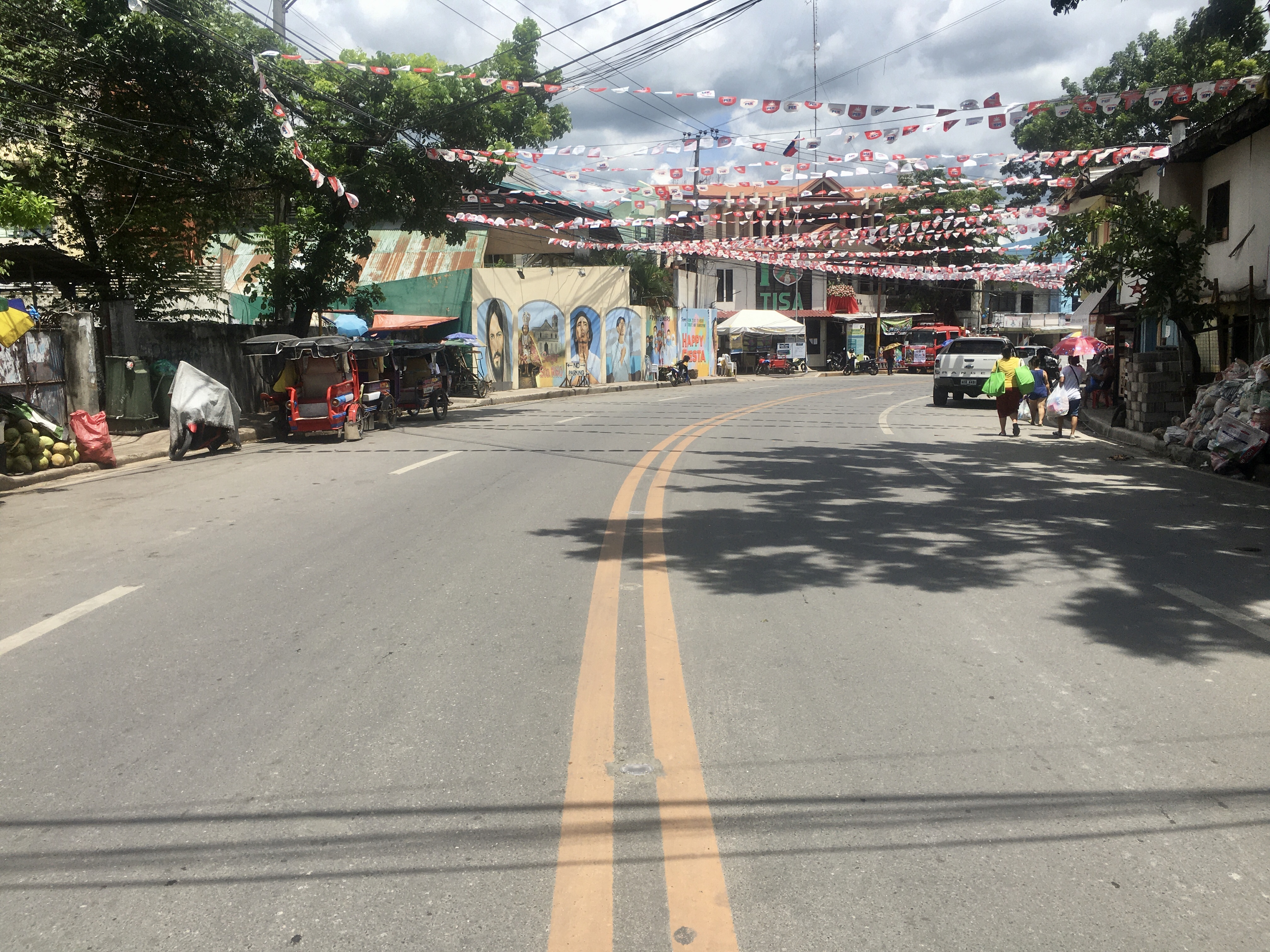
Towards Tisa Barangay Hall

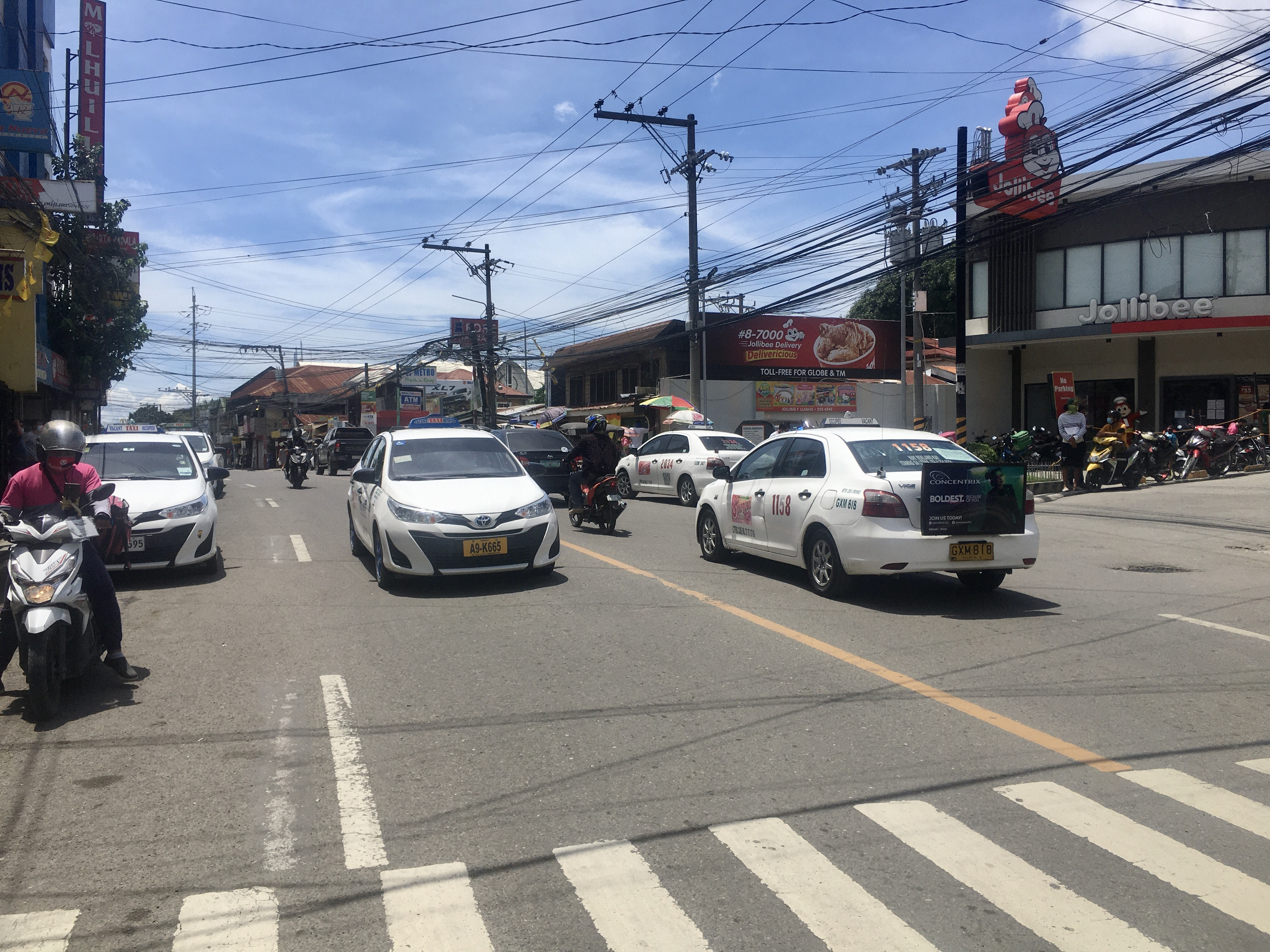
A Jollibee store along F. Llamas Street
