= Colón =

Colón, the primary Spanish translation of Christopher Columbus, may refer to:

== Places ==
Argentina

- Colón, Entre Ríos
- Colón Department, Córdoba
- Colón Department, Entre Ríos
- Colón, Buenos Aires

Colombia

- Colón, Nariño
- Colón, Putumayo
- Colón Department (Colombia)

Costa Rica

- Ciudad Colón

Cuba

- Colón, Cuba

El Salvador

- Colón, La Libertad

Honduras

- Colón Department (Honduras)

Mexico

- Colón, Querétaro

Panama

- Colón, Panama
- Colón Province

Puerto Rico

- Plaza Colón, in Mayagüez

Spain

- Plaza de Colón (Madrid)
- Colón (Metrovalencia), station in Valencia

Uruguay

- Colón Centro y Noroeste, barrio of Montevideo
- Colón Sudeste, barrio of Montevideo
- Colón, Uruguay, village in Lavalleja Department

Venezuela

- Colón, Venezuela
- Colón Municipality, Zulia in Zulia State

== Football teams ==
- Club Atlético Colón, from Santa Fe, Argentina
- Colón Fútbol Club, a Uruguayan club

== Other uses ==
- Colón (surname)
- Colón (currency)
  - Costa Rican colón, currency of Costa Rica
  - Salvadoran colón, former currency of El Salvador
- Preludio a Colón, a musical composition by Julián Carrillo
- Teatro Colón, Buenos Aires, Argentina

== See also ==
- The Colóns (disambiguation)
- Colon (disambiguation)
- Cologne (disambiguation)
