= Battle of Tres de Abril =

Philippines Revolutionary Movement

Battle of Tres de Abril Revolt of Cebu
- Part of the Philippine Revolution
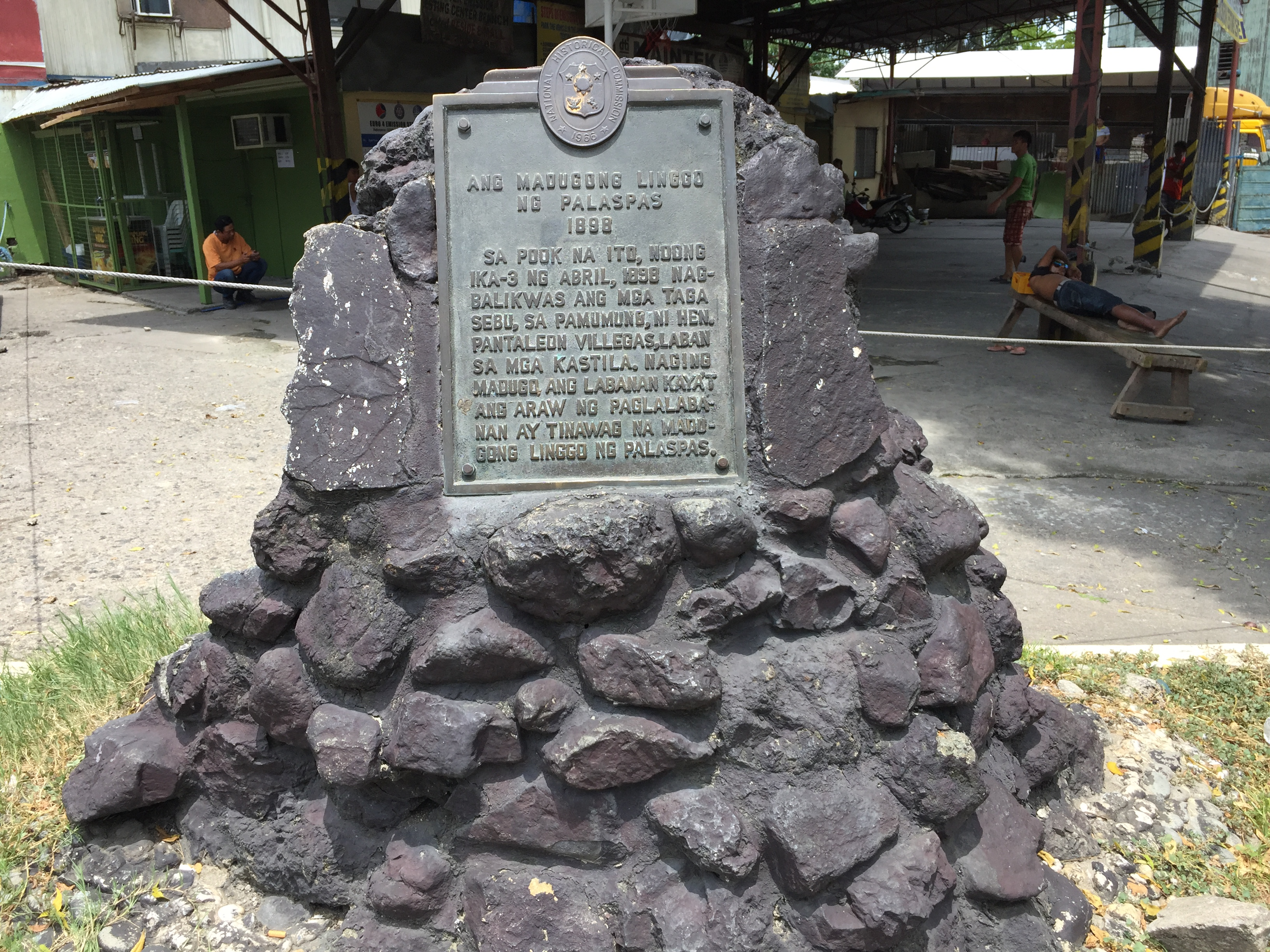
- Historical marker at Tres de Abril Street, Cebu City
Date	3–8 April 1898
Location	Cebu, Cebu, Visayan Islands, Spanish East Indies (now Philippines)
Result	Spanish victory

Belligerents
Katipunan	(Spain) Spanish Empire

Commanders and leaders
Leon Kilat †; Arcadio Maxilom; Florencio Gonzales; Fernando Llamas Fernández; Jose Ignacio Paua (Lâu Hing-puah); Bonifacio Aranas	(Spain) Fernando Primo de Rivera

Strength
5,000 katipuneros	500 cazadores 1 gunboat 1 cruiser

Casualties and losses
Unknown	Unknown

The Battle of Tres de Abril (Filipino: Labanan ng ika-tatlo ng Abril, Cebuano: Sangka sa Ikatulo sa Abril, Spanish: Batalla del Tres de Abril) occurred in 3 April 1898, during the Philippine Revolution. It was fought in the city of Cebu, a month after the Revolt of Cebu began.

== Battle ==
At 5 AM on 4 April, the rebels drove the Governor, General Montero, and his Spanish volunteers into Fort San Pedro and took control of Cebu City. When the gunboat Maria Cristina opened fire, the rebels retreated to the Chinese quarter of Lutao. On 7 April, 500 men of the 73rd Native Regiment and Spanish cazadores arrived under the command of General Tejeiro, and with the cruiser Don Juan de Austria, forcing the rebels to retreat to San Nicolas. The Spanish continued their pursuit of the rebels on 8 April into the mountain region.

== Aftermath ==
Leon Kilat was killed by his aide-de-camp, Apolinario Alcuitas, on April 8, 1898. The rebels then withdrew out of the city few weeks after he died. However, some of his generals, like General Maxilom, managed to capture some towns in the province such as Toledo and Balamban.

There is a commemorative monument for Leon Kilat on Kilat Street in Cebu City for the 3-day capture of Cebu City.

== Sources ==
- Foreman, John (1906). The Philippine Islands. A political, geographical, ethnographical, social and commercial history of the Philippine Archipelago and its political dependencies, embracing the whole period of Spanish rule (3rd ed.). New York: Charles Scribner's Sons.
