= Collon (surname) =

Collon is a surname. Notable people with the surname include:

- Albert Collon, Belgian ice hockey player
- Dominique Collon (born 1940), Belgian academic and curator
- Michel Collon (born 1946), Belgian writer and journalist
- Nicholas Collon (born 1983), British conductor

== See also ==
- Collen (surname)
- Alberto Collo (1883–1955), Italian actor
