= Henry Collen =

English painter and photographer (1797–1879)

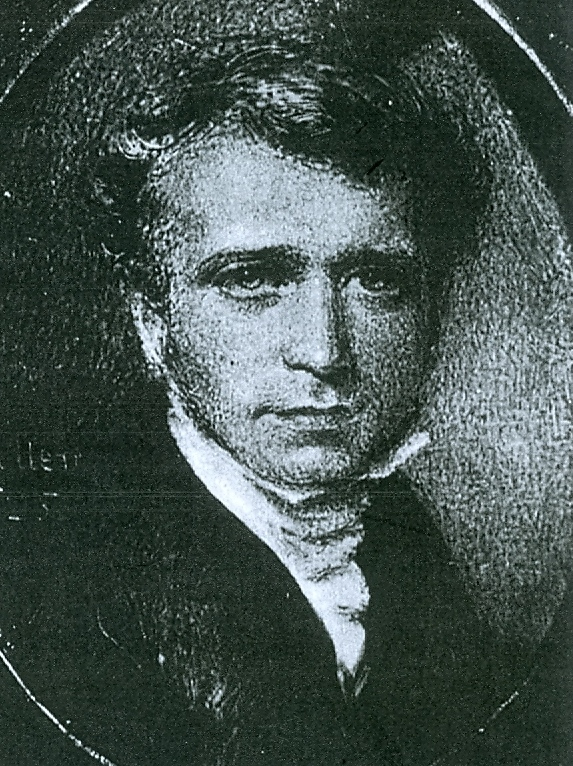
- Self-portrait, 1825
- Born: 9 October 1797; Middlesex, England
- Died: 8 May 1879 (aged 81); Brighton, England
- Education: Royal Academy of Arts; pupil of Sir George Hayter
- Known for: Miniature portrait painting; early calotype portraiture
- Spouse: Ellen Dison (m. 1826)
- Patrons: Queen Victoria; Duchess of Kent

Henry Collen (9 October 1797 – 8 May 1879) was an English miniature portrait painter and photographer. A pupil of painter Sir George Hayter at the Royal Academy Schools, Collen trained as a miniaturist, winning a Royal Academy Siver Medal in 1821. He was appointed "Miniature Painter to Her Majesty" for Queen Victoria of the United Kingdom following her accession in 1837. Later in life he turned to photography and was the first professional calotypist in London.

== Early life and education ==
Henry Collen was born on 9 October 1797 in Middlesex, and baptised at St. Pancras, Middlesex.

Henry Collen learned to paint at the Royal Academy and, from 1819, under the tutelage of Sir George Hayter whose family had been, and remained close personal friends of the Collen family. In fact, in her letters, Ellen states that she met Henry at the home of John Hayter, Sir George's younger brother, also a prolific painter. Henry Collen was the godfather of Sir George Hayter's third son Angelo Collen Hayter (1819–1898) who was an amateur painter and Sir George Hayter was the godfather of Henry's son Edwin (1843–1911), who was baptised Edwin Henry Hayter Collen.

In the eighteen-thirties, Henry Collen was personally acquainted with young Princess Victoria, being her drawing teacher and her miniature portrait painter ... For her fourteenth birthday on 24 May 1833 Victoria received a 'little painting for my album' from Collen, and on at least two occasions she sat for her portrait by him.

== Career ==
Princess Victoria, painted by Henry Collen in 1836 when she was 17, the year before she became Queen.

Henry Collen made a fairly moderate living as a portrait painter in London in the mid-19th century. Between 1820 and 1872 he exhibited at least one hundred paintings at the Royal Academy and the SBA (Society of British Artists), and by 1821 he had won a silver medal at the Royal Academy.

One of the four Henry Collen portraits was of a John Avery titled "Surgeon", which is a watercolour miniature on ivory, being only 8" × 5 3/4". This piece is on display at Bodelwyddan Castle, as are two other works, an oil painting on panel of Robert Vernon by George Jones and Henry Collen, painted in 1848 and a portrait of Henry Bickersteth, Baron Langdale, painted in 1829, entitled Master of the Roles. This piece is also a watercolour miniature on ivory and only 4 7/8" × 3 7/8. There are two pictures of Charles Mayne Young. One is another watercolour on ivory, painted in 1824. The other is a mezzotint published in 1826 but is not on display. Another piece that is not on display is a stipple engraving of Jane Elizabeth, Countess of Ellenborough, published in 1829. So, in all, six portraits that hang in the NPG are "associated" with Henry Collen.

The Victoria and Albert Museum has a regular miniature of a man, which is 4 7/8 in. × 3 3/4in., signed H. Collen/1846, the H and C being separate. The National Portrait Gallery has a miniature of Baron Langdale by Collen, 1829. The Wallace Collection has a miniature of Sarah the Countess of Warwick by Collen, 1825, after Hayter. At Windsor Castle are several miniatures by Collen, including portraits of the Duchess of Kent (1829) and Lady Catherine Vernon Harcourt (1838). One of them is a copy after Hayter. The Duke of Northumberland has a miniature of Lady Margaret Percy by Collen.

According to G. Scharf's Third Portion of a Catalogue of Pictures.... Duke of Bedford, 1878, p. 109:

The Duke of Bedford has an oval miniature of a lady, about 35/8 in. × 27/8 in., signed in front with a scratched signature "H Collen 1840" (the H and C not forming a monogram) and inscribed at the back "1840/painted by Henry Collen/Miniature Painter to/ The Queen and H.R.H. the Duchess of Kent/29 Somerset St /Portman Square/London." It is broader in treatment than many of his earlier works.

The British Museum has some engraved portraits by Collen.

Henry Collen worked in the company of many respected artists in mid-19th century London, as well as important scientists of his day. He collaborated in the early 1840s with the famous astronomer, John Frederick William Herschel. He may have associated with the artist Thomas Sully and his wife. Besides being close to the Hayter family, who were already established artists, Henry and Ellen were also close friends of Edwin Landseer, the well-known painter of animals and pastoral English landscapes as well as the designer of the four bronze lions at the base of Nelson's Column in Trafalgar Square, London. Landseer was the godfather of Henry's only son, Edwin. In the book of printed correspondence between Ellen and Edwin Collen, titled Letters from my Mother, Ellen mentioned that Landseer sent a note and a gift at Edwin's baptism. She also mentions going to the funeral of Charles Landseer.

== Portrait photographer ==
By the 1840s, Henry Collen was established as a portrait painter of some note. It is also at this time that his photographic work became known. In March 1840 Collen became interested in experimenting with electrotyping daguerreotype plates for printing purposes. By spring he was experimenting extensively with the calotype processes, the lenses, the paper, etc. (Schaaf)

Calotype was an early photographic process developed by Henry Fox Talbot who was a colleague of Collen's. Talbot supplied the photographic knowledge and Collen the artistic know-how.

In an article titled "Photography in the 1840s," Peter Marshall describes the distinction between daguerreotypes and calotypes. "The daguerrotype spread rapidly around the world...There were some limitations on the spread." Daguerre's process was somewhat limited by his prior patent in the UK, and so only those professionals who could afford a license were able to do so. Meanwhile, Talbot patented his calotype process in the UK and the US, but he was unable to get a patent in France which also limited its growth. Also, Marshall states, "In general, most professional photographers used the daguerreotype process in the 1840s, while the calotype was generally favored by those who were not attempting to earn an income."

In August 1841, Fox Talbot licensed Henry Collen as the first professional photographer or calotypist.

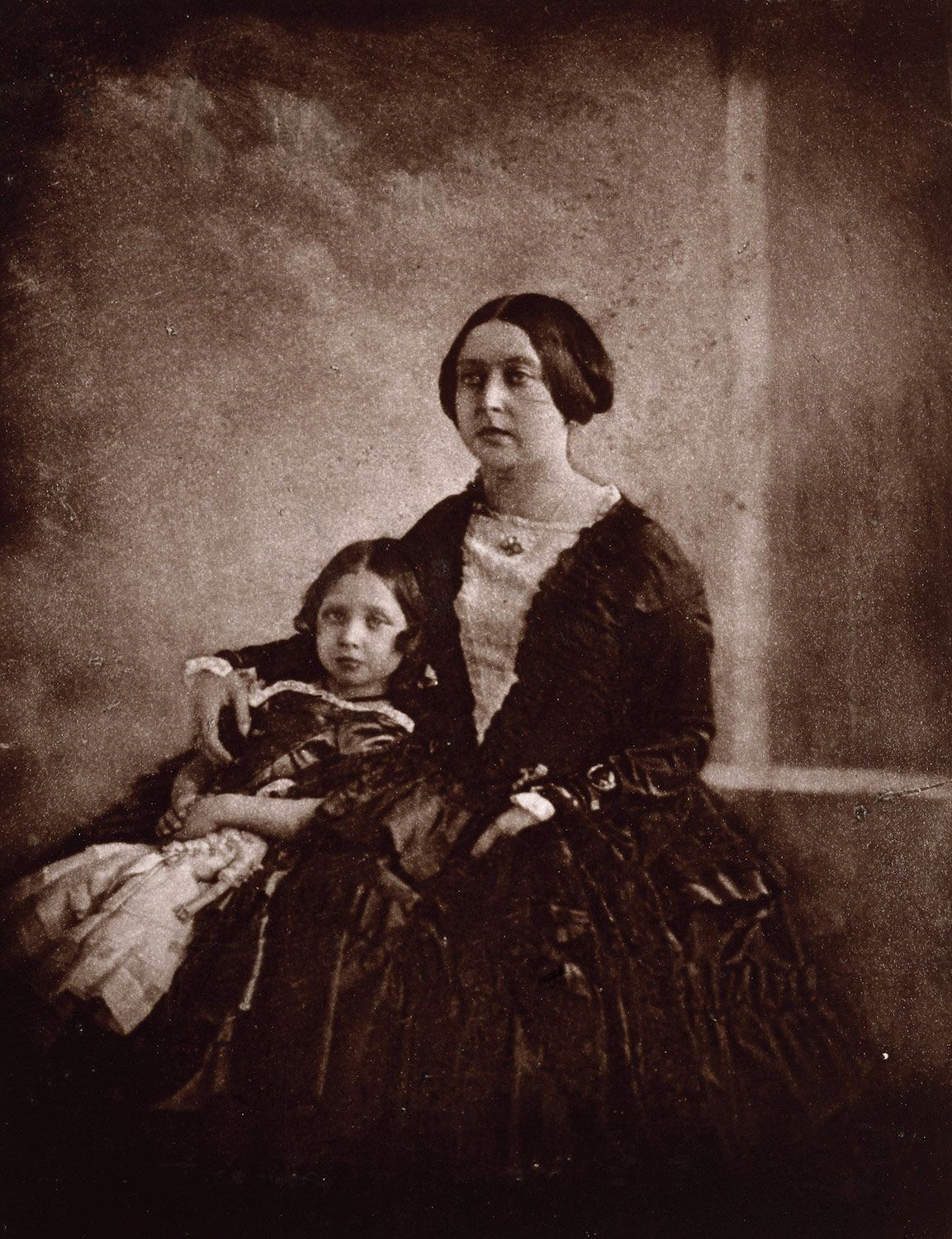
Queen Victoria with her daughter, Victoria, taken by Henry Collen in 1844

He then set himself up as a calotype portraitist in August 1841, in what was probably the first calotype portrait studio, at 29 Somerset Street, Portman Square, London (between Oxford Street and Manchester Square) near the present sight of Selfridge's. "Licenses were expensive. Talbot took 30 percent of Collen's takings for his use of the process" (Marshall). Henry received favourable responses from his colleagues about the quality of his portraits. He took approximately one thousand portraits using the calotype process. "Collen's photographic miniatures were a compromise between the old art of miniature painting and the new art of photography – they were overpainted paper photographs. The earliest extant photograph of Queen Victoria was almost certainly taken by Collen in 1844 or 1845." (Bill Jay)

Robert A. Sobieszek had this to say about photography and Henry Collen in Victorian England:

During the Victorian period, 'artistical' photographs were customarily judged on four points:

First, that they were exact replicas of Nature's form and appearance.

Second, they were to communicate the "feeling, sentiment, or sensations of Nature" and be able to cause similar emotional reactions.

Third, and more vague, the artistic photograph was to record the romantic expressions and impressions of this same Nature.

And, fourth, the final photograph was to be formally and spiritually perfect, reflecting Nature's perfections.

The landscapes of Roger Fenton and Francis Frith, and the portraiture of Antoine Claudet and Henry Collen . . . are clear and certain applications of the above prescriptions to photographic picture-making. (Sobieszek)

The distinguishing feature of Henry Collen's photographic portraits was that as an artist, he could touch up his portraits with paint. When he enhanced with paint, he was able to charge a bit more for them. Unfortunately, as time has passed, the silver of the photographs has faded, but the paint has not, so the portraits have an uneven, exaggerated, faded and sometimes splotchy look. It is thought that this is one reason why Collen's work in photography has not been recognised as it may have been if the portraits had remained intact.

== Scientific photography ==
In the 1844-46 period, Collen interacted with inventor Francis Ronalds, Honorary Director of the Kew Observatory. Ronalds was developing machines to make continuous recordings of the variations of meteorological parameters using photography. Collen in fact published the first paper written on the instruments. Ronalds put on record that "Collen claims a share in my inventions unjustly"; his view was that Collen’s advice to him had concerned only photographic processing techniques. Ronalds went on to build and describe various different photo-recording machines in a series of reports and papers, which were employed in observatories around the world until well into the 20th century.

== Photocopier ==
In the late 1970s, Larry Schaaf wrote about the contributions of Henry Collen to the field of photography in its early stages in London in the 19th century. Schaaf's premise was that Collen's work was indeed noteworthy, and had perhaps been overshadowed by the earlier work of William Henry Fox Talbot in the same field. The information on the following pages comes from Mr. Schaaf's article titled, "Henry Collen and the Treaty of Nanking," which appeared in The History of Photography, an international quarterly, October 1982.

The Treaty of Nanking was signed on 29 August 1842. The treaty signalled the end of the "Opium Wars" between China and England. It also ceded the island of Hong Kong to England and was of great commercial and psychological importance to the British Empire. Photography was in its infancy. Daguerre's method had the "ability to record the fine detail" but would have supplied "only a small metal plate as a facsimile of the rice paper." Talbot's process was far more suitable for copying the original treaty, and so authorities turned to the first man licensed to practice in London" and the man who had the know-how to make the photographic copy of the 4-foot-long (1.2 m) treaty.(Schaaf)

Schaaf states, "Henry Collen was in the unique position of both owning the patent rights and of having access to the circles of power. As miniature-painter to the Queen, he would have been in a position to discuss such a project with the proper people..."

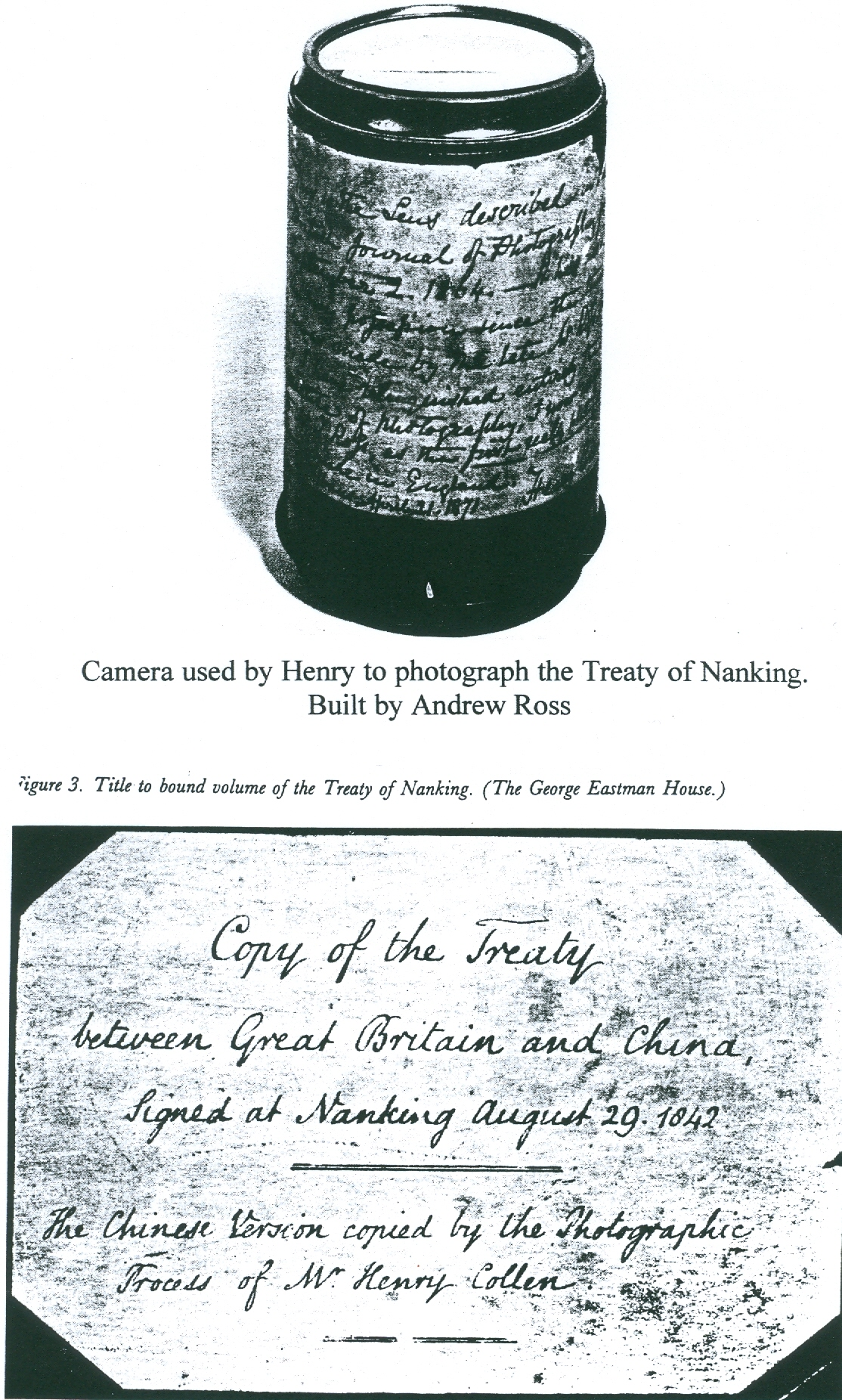
Treaty of Nanking and Camera

On Christmas Day, Collen produced at least two photographic copies of the original 4-foot-long (1.2 m) document handwritten in ink. "Copying a four-foot -long document with delicate lettering out to the edges would be quite difficult, especially in 1842" (Schaaf). He goes on to state that he thinks Collen merits a great deal more study than he had been given to that date.

Since Larry Schaaf wrote his 1982 article about the Treaty of Nanking, R. Derek Wood has written another article titled "Photocopying the Treaty of Nanking in January 1843." In it, Wood includes new information about the number of copies produced by Henry Collen and their whereabouts. It seems that the original treaty was brought to London for the Queen's signature after Collen made the copy. At the last minute, it was decided that an extra copy should be made to hang at Buckingham Palace, which is why Collen was working on it on Christmas Day. Wood believes that three copies were made in all. The copy that hung at the palace is thought to have been discarded but there is a copy at the International Museum of Photography and Film at the George Eastman House in Rochester, NY. It is in book form, 22 and 16 pages in English and Chinese, respectively, and is bound in leather. (see photo) Mr. Wood's article deciphers the long journey of this copy and the location of the original Chinese document. Collen's copies were taken to China, but by 1877 the original could not be located. It seems that when in the very last few days of June in 1997, as Hong Kong was passed back to the People's Republic of China, a(n)....announcement was made to reveal that Chiang Kai-shek's Chinese Nationalist forces had secretly taken the original Treaty of Nanking when they retreated to Taiwan from China in 1949. And the documents have been hidden in a sealed vault of the Taiwan Foreign Ministry. (Wood)

Meanwhile, in 1952, the George Eastman House was offered for purchase one of Henry Collen's copies from a dealer of rare books in California. It was unknown how this dealer had obtained this copy.

Wood's article also includes copies of bills for production costs and copies of the treaty (included in Appendix).

At any rate, even after such seemingly important strides in the infant field of photography, Henry Collen still had unsurmountable hurdles to face in his attempts to make photography a financially viable profession. The problem, in part, was due to the nature of his relationship to Talbot.

The relationship between Henry Collen and Henry Talbot seems quite complex. They were probably good friends. Talbot originated the calotype process and licensed Collen to practice it. Henry paid Talbot a fair share of his profits. Collen worked to perfect the process and invested considerable time and energy into this work. He wanted patent protection rights from Talbot because of this. Talbot stalled in this area. As mentioned earlier, Talbot had the scientific knowledge and Collen the artistic, but for some reason, Talbot did not pursue the business possibilities attendant to the caloytype process. When Collen was asked to photograph the Treaty of Nanking, Talbot's wife later lamented about why Talbot himself hadn't done the job "for her Majesty." (Schaaf).

Schaaf also states that Talbot for some reason did not share all of his expertise with Collen, and at some point Henry's lack of scientific know-how limited his ability to experiment further. Henry Collen had taken over one thousand calotype portraits but had received payment for only 265 of them. It was not profitable for Collen or Talbot to continue. He ended his calotype business in 1844 and retired to St. Albans in 1861. He had photographed some of the most important people of his day and his photographic work was respected enough to hang in Buckingham Palace.

The largest collections of his photographic works are in the George Eastman House in Rochester, N.Y. and The Science Museum in London as well as the Fox Talbot Museum and the Royal Photographic Society.

In spite of an unfortunately shortened photographic career, Henry Collen is mentioned and published in various journals of photography and science (see appendix).

== Personal life ==
When he was 29, he married Ellen Dison, who was born in 1805 and had spent her childhood in Ireland. They were married on 12 August 1826 in Maghera in County Londonderry in Ireland.

== Death ==
He died on 8 May 1879 in Brighton.
