= C. Padilla Street =

Street in Cebu City, Philippines

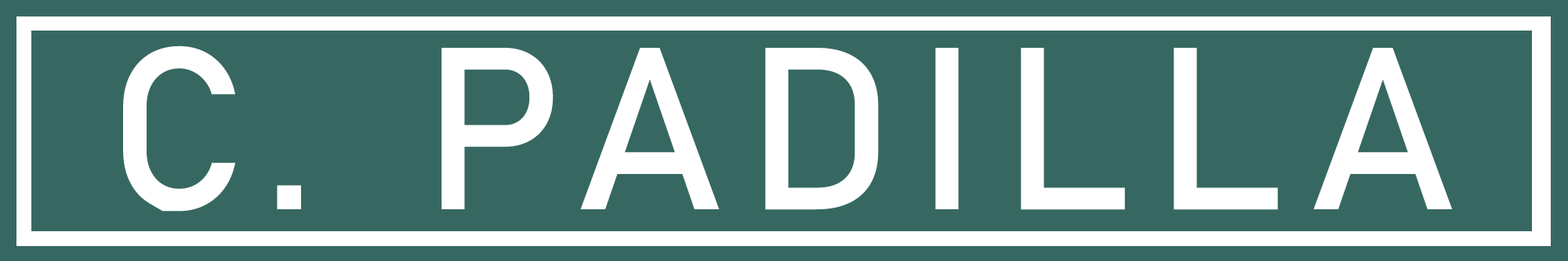
- Native name: Dalan C. Padilla (Cebuano)
- Namesake: Candido Padilla
- Length: 1.86 km (1.16 mi)
- Location: Cebu City, Cebu, Philippines
- From: Colon Street
- Major junctions: Panganiban Street; J. Climaco Street; Panganiban Street; Tres de Abril Street; Lakandula Street; T. Abella Street; J.M. Basa Street; Figueroa Street; Carlock Street
- To: F. Vestil Street

C. Padilla Street (Cebuano: Dalan C. Padilla) is a national tertiary road in Cebu City, Cebu, Philippines. It commences at Colon Street in Barangay Pahina Central, passes through several junctions in Barangays San Niolas Proper, Pahina San Nicolas, Sawang Calero and Duljo-Fatima and ends at the junction of F. Vestil Street and L. Gabuya Street in Barangay Mambaling.

The street is named after Candido Padilla, a Cebuano revolutionary who previously served as the Capital Municipal (lit. transl. Municipal Captain) of San Nicolas, a separate town prior to its merger with Cebu City.

== Route description ==
The street begins at Colon Street in Barangay Pahina Central as a four-lane road and meets the intersection of the one-way lane Panganiban Street in Barangay Pahina San Nicolas. After crossing the Colon Bridge which spans the Guadalupe River, it passes through several old commercial building and goes on towards the Archdiocesan Shrine of San Nicolas de Tolentino Parish where it becomes a five-lane road. Upon reaching the junction of T. Abella Street, it becomes a narrow two-lane road as it passes through Don Carlos A. Gothong Memorial National High School then reverts into a four-lane road in the junction of Carlock Street, then passing through an area locally known as "Jai-alai" where the old jai-alai building used to stand before it was demolished in 2014 to make way for Gaisano Grand Jai-alai. The street ends at the junction of F. Vestil and L. Gabuya streets in Barangay Mambaling.

== Connecting streets ==
- Panganiban Street
- Tres de Abril Street
- Lakandula Street
- T. Abella Street
- J.M. Basa Street
- Figueroa Street
- Carlock Street
- R. Padilla Street
- Spolarium Street

== Landmarks ==
- Pahina San Nicolas Barangay Hall
- Archdiocesan Shrine of San Nicolas de Tolentino Parish
- Don Carlos A. Gothong Memorial National High School
- Gaisano Grand Jai-alai
