= Abba Kolon =

Abba Kolon is a mythical Roman mentioned in a Talmudic legend concerning the foundation of Rome, which, according to the Haggadah, was a result of the impious conduct of the Jewish kings. According to the legend, the first settlers of Rome found that their huts collapsed as soon as built, whereupon Abba Ḳolon said to them, "Unless you mix water from the Euphrates with your mortar, nothing that you build will stand." Then he offered to supply such water, and for this purpose journeyed through the East as a cooper, and returned with water from the Euphrates in wine-casks. The builders mixed this water with the mortar and built new huts that did not collapse. Hence the proverb, "A city without Abba Ḳolon is not worthy of the name." The newly built city was therefore called "Babylonian Rome".

Probably this legend was intended to show the dependence of the Roman empire upon the natural resources of the East; but it contains a number of points that still remain unexplained. The above-mentioned Roman, or, more properly, Greco-Roman, proverb is just as obscure as the name "Abba Ḳolon," which, originating in some classic word, was distorted by the Jews into "a father of a colony," not without the mental reservation that "Ḳolon" is the Aramaic equivalent of "shame." An attempt has been made to identify the name with that of Deucalion, to which it bears no philological or historical relation. The most probable identification is that by Brüll, who refers to a legend in John Malalas' "Chronicles," p. 301, of a magician named Ablaccon, under the emperor Tiberius. This Ablaccon protected the city of Antioch, by the aid of a rampart of stone, against the overflow of the mountain streams.
