= Katipunan Street =

Street in Cebu City, Philippines

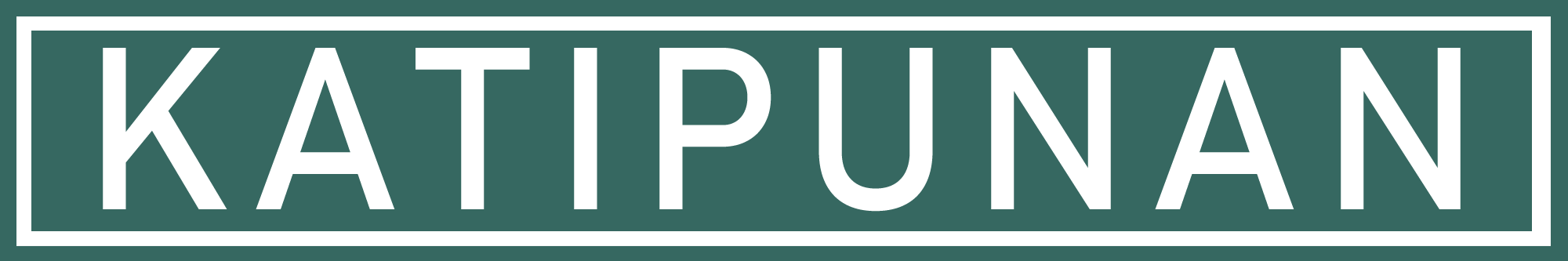
- Native name: Dalan Katipunan (Cebuano)
- Namesake: Katipunan
- Length: 1.93 km (1.20 mi); Based on DPWH Atlas 2019
- Location: Cebu City, Cebu, Philippines
- From: N. Bacalso Avenue; V. Rama Avenue in Barangay Calamba
- Major junctions: A. Lopez Street; Salvador Street
- To: F. Llamas Street in Barangay Tisa

Katipunan Street (Cebuano: Dalan Katipunan) is a national tertiary road in Cebu City, Cebu, Philippines. It commences at the corner of N. Bacalso Avenue and V. Rama Avenue in Barangay Calamba, passes through the junctions of A. Lopez and Salvador streets and ends at the junction of F. Llamas Street in Barangay Tisa.

The street is named after the Katipunan, also known as the Kataas-taasan, Kagalang-galangan, Katipunan ng mga Anak ng Bayan (KKK), a Philippine revolutionary society founded in 1892.

== Route description ==
The street begins as a one-way lane accessible for vehicles coming from V. Rama Avenue in Barangay Calamba and from N. Bacalso Avenue, continues towards Bible Baptist Church and passes through several commercial establishments until it reaches the junction of A. Lopez Street, a portion of which connects to Tres de Abril Street. It then becomes a two-way lane beyond the said the junction where it passes through several residential and also commercial establishments. Labangon Elementary School and Labangon Barangay Hall are among the important landmarks along the way. A few meters after reaching the junction of Salvador Street is the Labangon Town Center which marks the boundary of the said barangay with Barangay Tisa. The road then leads to Barangay Tisa's siomai and halo-halo stores until it ends at the junction of F. Llamas Street. An extension road leading to the public market and the hilly parts of the said barangay also connects the end tip of the street.

== Landmarks ==
- Bible Baptist Church
- Labangon Fire Station
- Labangon Elementary School
- Labangon Barangay Hall
- Labangon Town Center

== Connecting streets ==
- A. Lopez Street
- Camomot Francia Street
- Balaga Drive
- Gen. Java Street
- Salvador Street
- Narra Street
- Emerald Road
- F. Pacaña Street
- Cabarrubias Street
