= Alba Colón =

American automotive engineer and racing sports executive

Alba Lynnette Colón Rodríguez (born 1968) is an American automotive engineer and racing sports executive, the former program manager of Chevrolet drag racing and NASCAR programs and the director of team operations for Hendrick Motorsports.

== Education and career ==
Colón was born in 1968 in Salamanca, Spain; her parents were a physician and a teacher. She moved with her family to Puerto Rico when she was three, and studied mechanical engineering as a student at the University of Puerto Rico at Mayagüez. Initially inspired by Sally Ride to aim for a career in space engineering as the first Puerto Rican woman astronaut, her interest in cars and racing began with a student solar car project, and with her participation in the 1991 Formula SAE student race car design program.

After working for Sterling Pharmaceuticals in Puerto Rico, she moved to the mainland US in 1994 to work for General Motors, initially as a data acquisition engineer for NASCAR races. She became manager of their Pro Stock Truck program in 1998, and was named as program manager for Chevrolet and Pontiac drag racing in 1999. In 2001 she became Chevrolet's program manager for NASCAR, "the only top female engineer in the sport of NASCAR racing". She moved to Hendrick Motorsports in 2018.

== Recognition ==
The University of Puerto Rico at Mayagüez named Colón as a distinguished alumna in 2008 and again in 2011. Hispanic Lifestyle magazine named Colón as a 2017 Latina of Influence. She was the 2017 recipient of the STEM Award at the Hispanic Heritage Awards, the 2021 recipient of the ASME Kate Gleason Award and the 2022 recipient of the Rodica Baranescu Award of SAE International.
