= Edwin Henry Hayter Collen =

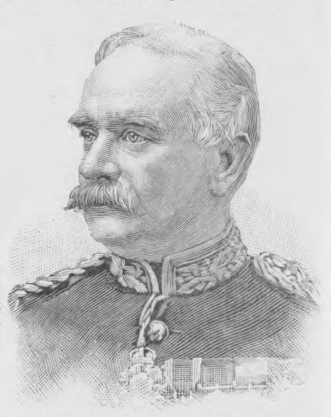

Lieutenant-General Sir Edwin Henry Hayter Collen GCIE CB (1843–1911) was a British Indian Army officer, who served in the Council of the Viceroy of India.

== Background and family ==
Collen was born in the Marylebone district of London on 17 June 1843, the son of Henry Collen, a miniature portrait painter and early photographer to the court. He married, in 1873, Blanche Rigby, daughter of Charles Rigby, JP, and they had three sons and a daughter.

== Army career ==
Collen joined the Royal Artillery in 1863, and served in Abyssinia in 1868 and later in Afghanistan and Sudan. After passing through Staff college in 1871-72, he joined the Indian Staff Corps. As an administrator in India, he served as Secretary in the Military Department, and was a Military Member of the Council of the Viceroy of India from December 1895 until he retired in April 1901. He was promoted to Major-General on 18 January 1900.

== Honours ==
Collens was knighted as a Knight Commander of the Order of the Indian Empire (KCIE) in the 1893 New Year Honours list, and was promoted to a Knight Grand Commander (GCIE) of the same order in the 1901 New Year Honours list. He was appointed a Companion of the Order of the Bath (CB) in the 1897 Diamond Jubilee Honours list.

== Works ==
- "The Indian Army" . The Empire and the century. London: John Murray. 1905. pp. 663–81.

== Sources ==
- Woods, Gabriel Stanley (1912). "Collen, Edwin Henry Hayter" . In Lee, Sidney (ed.). Dictionary of National Biography (2nd supplement). London: Smith, Elder & Co.
- Woods, G. S.; Lunt, James. "Collen, Sir Edwin Henry Hayter (1843–1911)". Oxford Dictionary of National Biography (online ed.). Oxford University Press. doi:10.1093/ref:odnb/32495. (Subscription or UK public library membership required.)
