= Colon Street =

Street in Cebu City, Philippines

Coordinates: 10°17′48.28″N 123°53′56.45″E

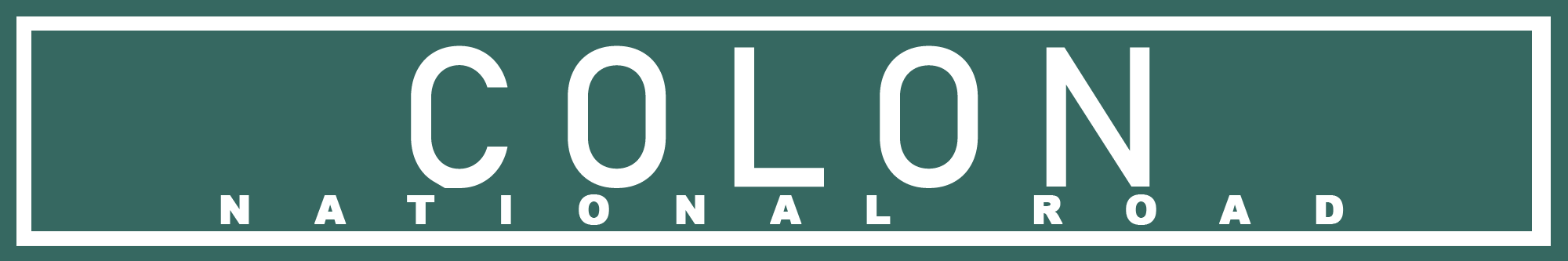

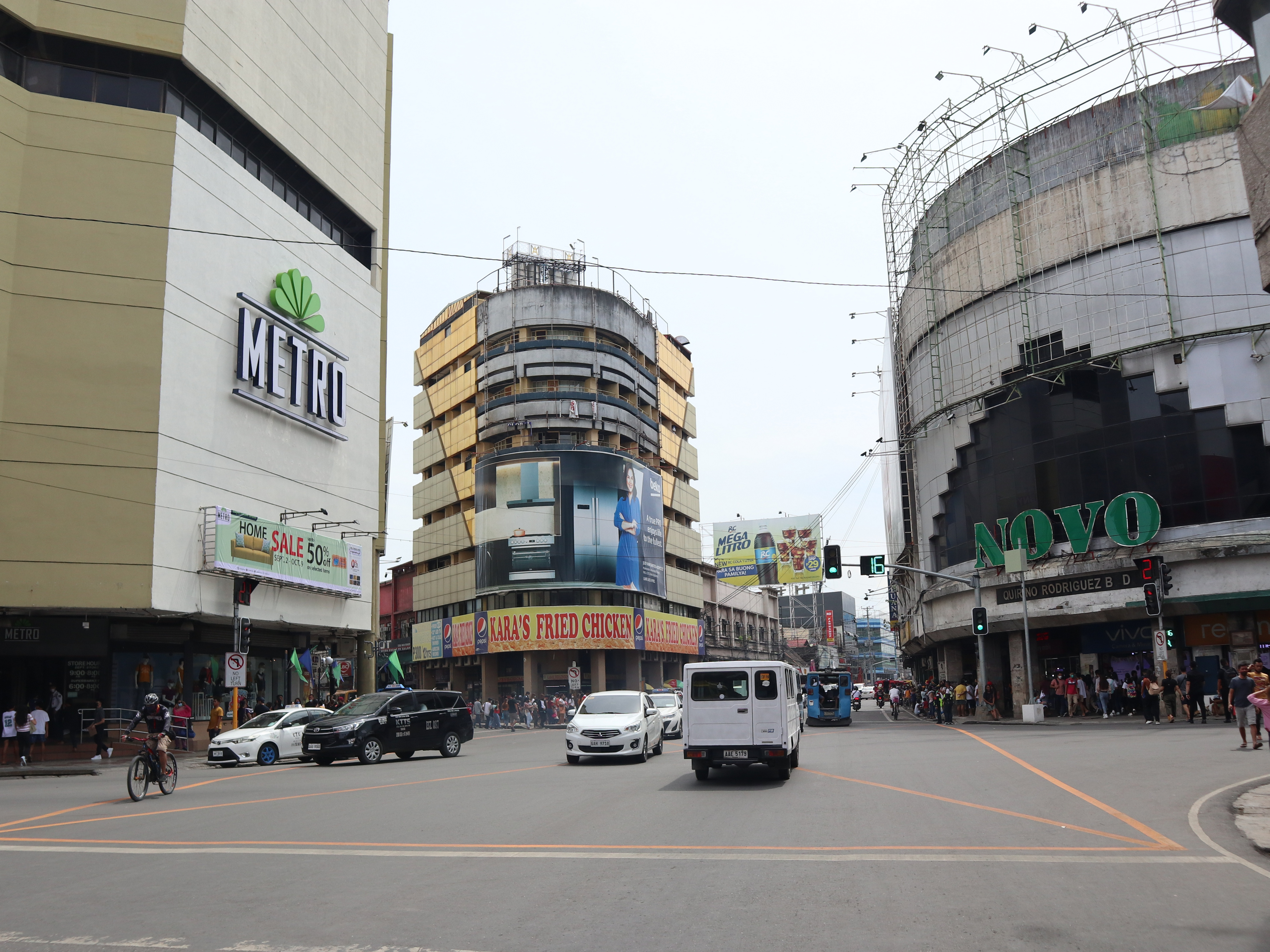
- Interactive map of Colon Street
- Native name: Dalan Colon (Cebuano)
- Namesake: Cristóbal Colón (Christopher Columbus)
- Length: 1.17 km (0.73 mi) (based on Google Maps)
- Location: Cebu City, Philippines
- East end: P. Burgos Street
- Major junctions: D. Jakosalem Street; Junquera Street; Pelaez Street; Legaspi Street; Osmeña Boulevard; P. Lopez Street; A. Borromeo Street; Leon Kilat Street; J. Climaco Street; Panganiban Street
- West end: C. Padilla Street

Colon Street (Cebuano: Dalan Colon, Filipino: Daang Colon, Spanish: Calle Colón; Tagalog pronunciation: [koˈlɔn], Spanish pronunciation: [koˈlon]) is a historical street in Cebu City. Located in the city's downtown, Colon Street is often called the oldest and shortest national road in the Philippines. It is named after Cristóbal Colón (Christopher Columbus). Built in 1565, the street traces its origins to Miguel Lopez de Legazpi, the Spanish conquistador who arrived in the Philippines to establish a colony in the 16th century and eventually developed the street under his leadership.

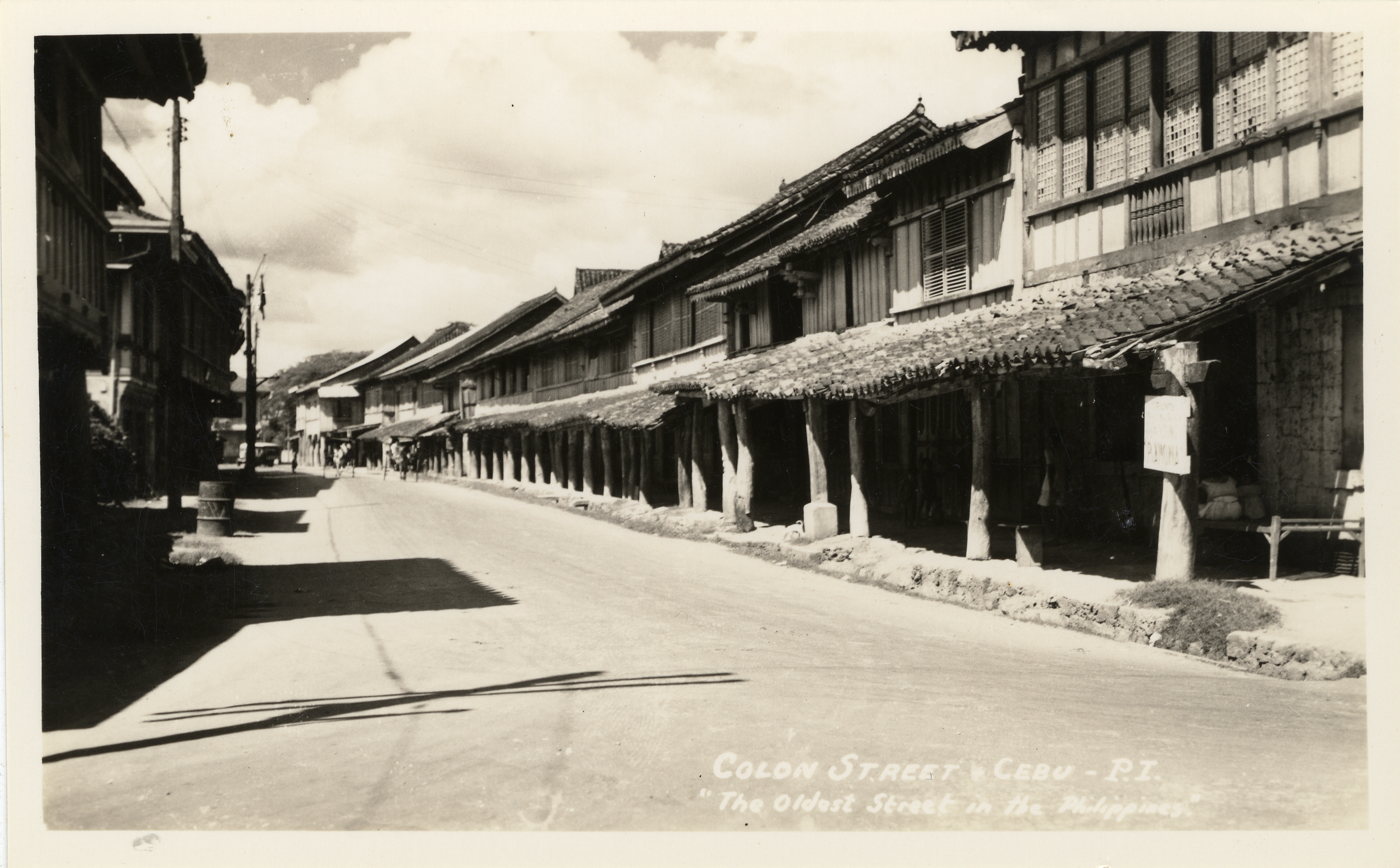
Colon Street, c. 1938

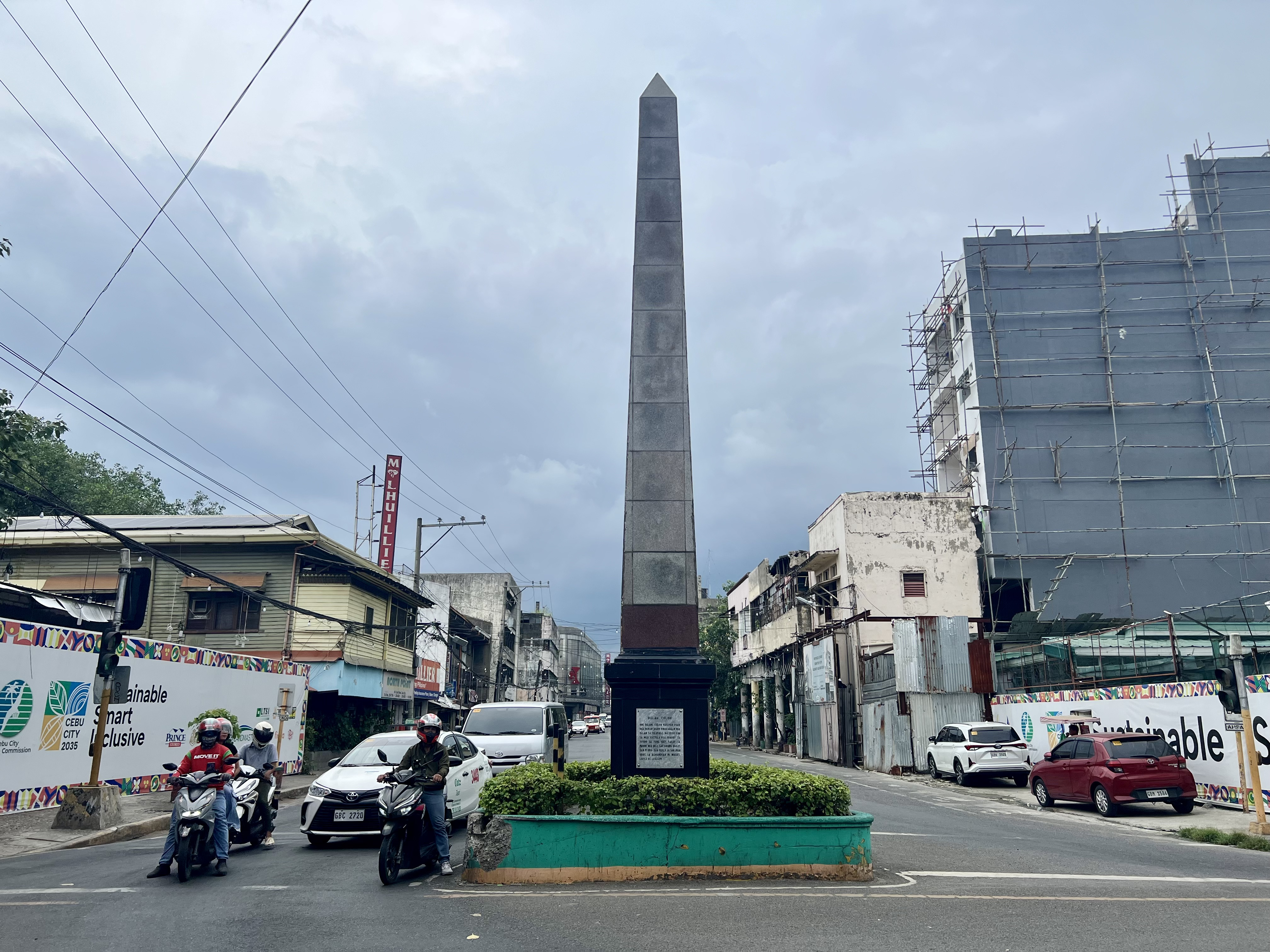
Colon street obelisk with historical markers as seen from P. Burgos street in 2026

Colon, crowded and a bit run-down now, was the site of fashionable shops, offices, and movie houses. It was once the heart of Cebu City's shopping and business activity. Beginning in the early 1990s, much of this activity has shifted to the more modern, bigger, and diverse commercial and business districts now spread in almost all of the urban areas of Cebu in what was considered residential and leisure settlements.

In 2006, the Cebu City Council proposed a plan to close parts of Colon Street from vehicular traffic and convert it into a tourism zone. However, this proposal received opposition from businessmen and motorists due to concerns about security and parking spaces.

In 2007, the Colon Night Market, which aims to revive Colon as a vibrant commercial hub, was launched. The night market runs multiple times throughout the year, most notably during the Filipino Christmas season from September to December until the Sinulog celebrations in January of the following year. Since its launch, the night market has run yearly with the exemption of 2020 and 2021 due to the COVID-19 pandemic.

== Historical dispute ==
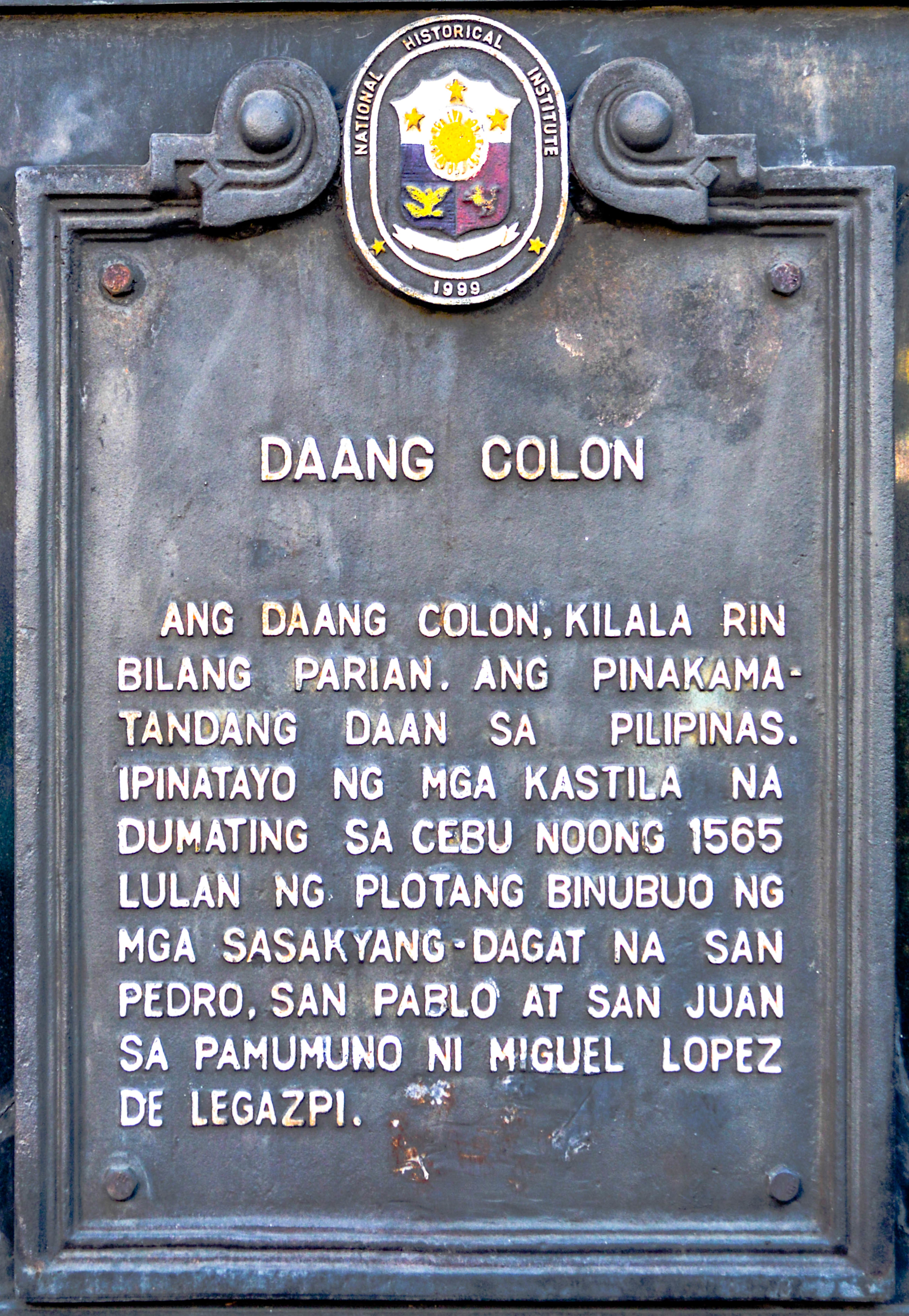
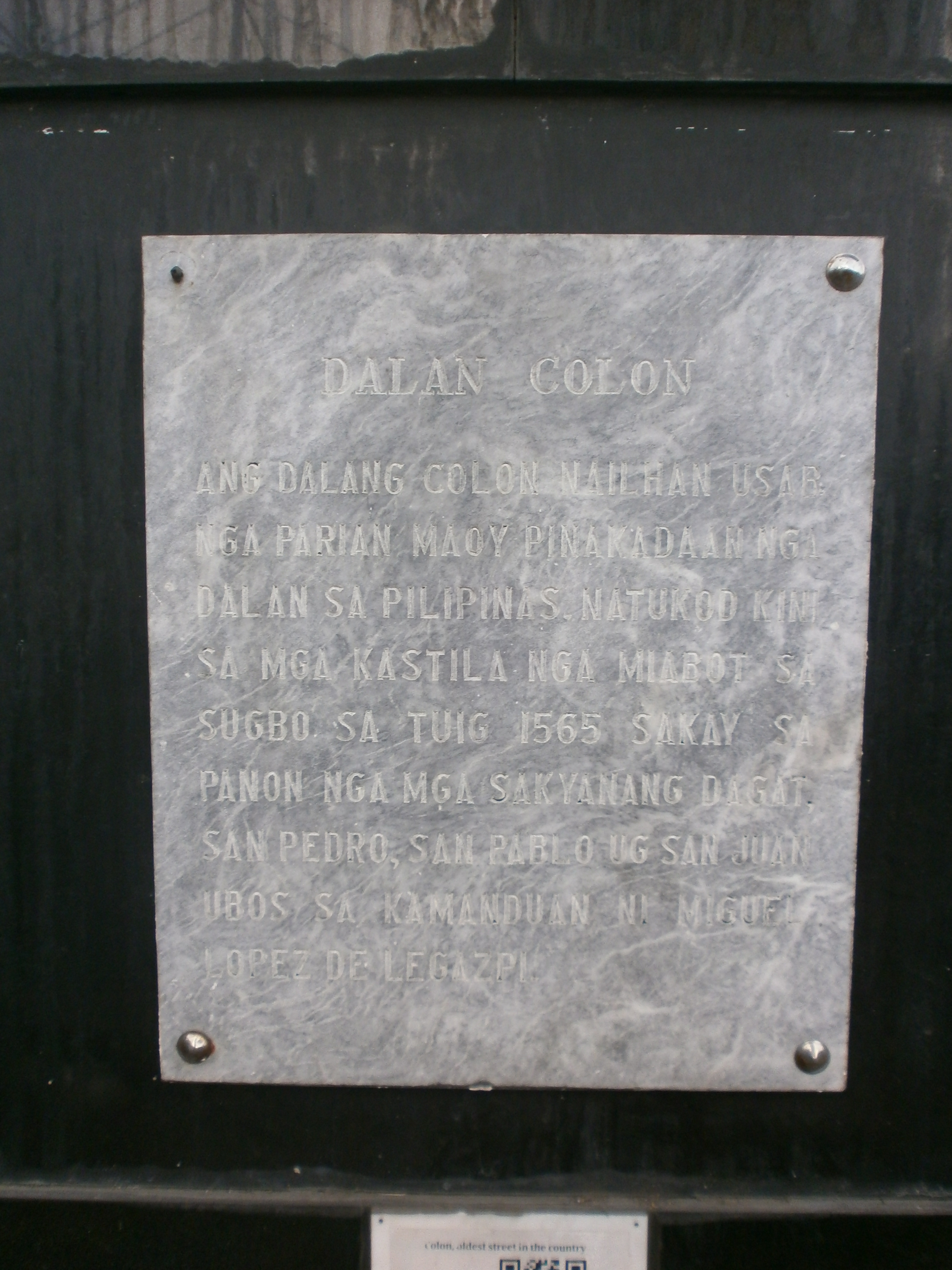
Colon Street historical marker in Filipino (left) and Cebuano (right)

While Colon Street has long been recognized as the oldest street in the Philippines, this claim is being challenged. Historians point out that no document or map confirms the construction of Colon Street during the initial period of the Spanish era in the Philippines. The earliest map indicating the presence of Colon Street was dated 1873.

The origin of Colon Street being labeled as the oldest street in the Philippines can be traced back to 1910. During that time, Cebu-based shop American Bazar sold a postcard showing a section of Colon Street with a label "Oldest Street in Cebu". A few years later, photo studio L.G. Joseph printed a postcard of the same street, this time with the label “Oldest Street in the Philippines”. The claim gained further traction in 1933, when the American Express Company added this information to their first ever guidebook of the Philippines.

== See also ==
- Calle Escolta, a historic street in Manila, Philippines
- Calle Real, a historic street in Iloilo City, Philippines
- Media related to Colon Street (Cebu City) at Wikimedia Commons
