= Colón, Nariño =

Colón
- Municipality and town
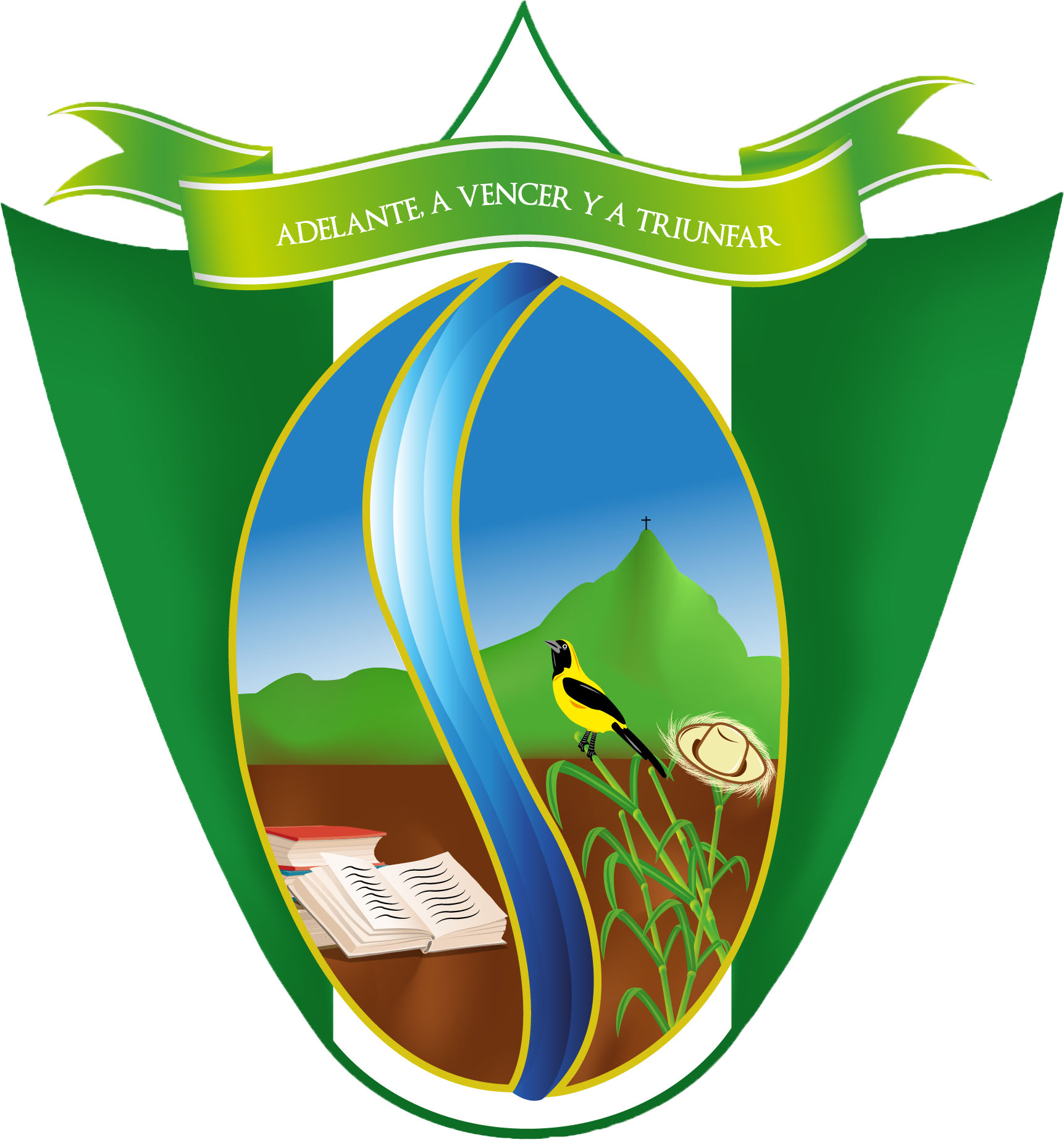
- Flag Coat of arms

- Location of the municipality and town of Colón in the Nariño Department of Colombia
- Coordinates: 1°38′39″N 77°1′10″W
- Country: Colombia
- Department: Nariño Department

Area
  - Municipality and town: 82 km^{2} (32 sq mi)
- Elevation: 1,914 m (6,280 ft)

Population
  - Municipality and town: 10,127
  - Urban: 1,588
- Time zone: UTC-5 (Colombia Standard Time)

Colón is a municipality in the Nariño Department, Colombia. The municipality head is the town of Génova.
