= Kolong =

Kolong may refer to:

- Kolong River, a river in Assam, India
- Kolong (film), a 2019 Malaysian horror film
- Kolong language, spoken in parts of Himachal Pradesh, India

== See also ==
- Kulung (disambiguation)
