= Michel Collon =

Belgian writer and journalist (born 1946)

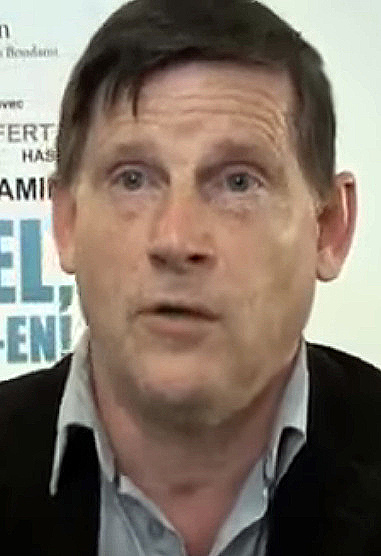
- Michel Collon.
- Born: 1946 (age 79–80); Ixelles, Belgium
- Occupations: critic, journalist, publicist, writer

Michel Collon (born 1946) is a Belgian writer, and journalist for the magazine of the Workers' Party of Belgium and for his own website Investig’Action.

== Biography ==
Michel Collon started his career in the Belgian weekly Solidaire. He continued his work independently by writing books, making films and an Internet newsletter broadcast to 40 000 subscribers. He is affiliated with the Workers' Party of Belgium, and has organised a network of civil observers in Yugoslavia and in Iraq. He took part in the anti-imperialist conference Axis for Peace.

Michel Collon denounced the misuse by Dalai Lama of a photograph that implied Chinese soldiers had dressed up as Buddhist monks and had provoked the 2008 Tibetan unrest. According to the Los Angeles Times, this photograph was taken from the Michelle Yeoh film The Touch, which was filmed in Lhassa between 2001 & 2002.

Various commentators consider that Collon has been promoting conspiracy theories or alternative theories in his presentation of international politics.
