= The Colóns =

The Colóns may refer to:

- The Colóns (2002–2010) - the professional wrestling tag team of Carlito and Primo
- Primo and Epico - the professional wrestling tag team of Primo and Epico
