= Afro-Mexicans =

Mexicans of predominantly African descent

Afromexicanos (Spanish)
- Percentage of total and partial Afro-Mexicans in each municipality (2020 census)

Total population
- Sub-Saharan ancestry predominates 2,576,213 (2020 census); 2.04% of the Mexican population

Regions with significant populations
- Guerrero, Lázaro Cárdenas, Huetamo, Oaxaca, Veracruz, Greater Mexico City, Guadalajara and Múzquiz Municipality

Languages
- Mexican Spanish; Amerindian languages

Religion
- Christianity (Catholicism, Protestantism), Afro-American religions

Related ethnic groups
- African Americans, West Africans, Afro–Latin Americans, Blaxicans, Haitian Mexicans, and other Mexicans

Afro-Mexicans (Spanish: Afromexicanos), also known as Black Mexicans (Spanish: Mexicanos negros), are Mexicans of total or predominantly African ancestry. As a single population, Afro-Mexicans include individuals descended from both free and enslaved Africans who arrived to Mexico during the colonial era, as well as post-independence migrants. This population includes Afro-descended people from neighboring English, French, and Spanish-speaking countries of the Caribbean and Central America, descendants of enslaved Africans in Mexico and those from the Deep South during Slavery in the United States, and to a lesser extent recent migrants directly from Africa. Today, there are localized communities in Mexico with significant although not predominant African ancestry. These are mostly concentrated in specific communities, including populations in the states of Oaxaca, Michoacán, Guerrero, and Veracruz.

Throughout the century following the Spanish conquest of the Aztec Empire of 1519, a significant number of African slaves were brought to the Veracruz. According to Philip D. Curtin's The Atlantic Slave Trade: A Census, an estimated 200,000 enslaved Africans were kidnapped and brought to New Spain, which later became modern Mexico.

The creation of a national Mexican identity, especially after the Mexican Revolution, emphasized Mexico's indigenous Amerindians and Spanish European heritage, excluding African history and contributions from Mexico's national consciousness. Although Mexico had a significant number of enslaved Africans during the colonial era, much of the African-descended population became absorbed into surrounding Mestizo (mixed European/Amerindian), Mulatto (mixed European/African), and Indigenous populations through unions among the groups. By the mid-20th century, Mexican scholars were advocating for Black visibility. It was not until 1992 that the Mexican government officially recognized African culture as being one of the three major influences on the culture of Mexico, the others being Spanish and Indigenous.

The genetic legacy of Mexico's once significant number of colonial-era enslaved Africans is evidenced in non-Black Mexicans as trace amounts of sub-Saharan African DNA found in the average Mexican. In the 2015 census, 64.9% (896,829) of Afro-Mexicans also identified as indigenous Amerindian Mexicans. It was also reported that 9.3% of Afro-Mexicans speak an indigenous Mexican language.

About 2.4-3% of Mexico's population has significantly large African ancestry, with 2.5 million self-recognized during the 2020 Inter-census Estimate. However, some sources put the official number at around 5% of the total population. While other sources imply that due to the systemic erasure of Black people from Mexican society, and the tendency of Afro Mexican people to identify with other ethnic groups other than Afro Mexicans, the percentage of Afro-Mexicans is most likely actually much higher than what the official number says. In the 21st century, some people who identify as Afro-Mexicans are the children and grandchildren of naturalized Black immigrants from Africa and the Caribbean. The 2015 Inter-census Estimate was the first time in which Afro-Mexicans could identify themselves as such and was a preliminary effort to include the identity before the 2020 census which now shows the country's population is 2.04%. The question asked on the survey was "Based on your culture, history, and traditions, do you consider yourself Black, meaning Afro-Mexican or Afro-descendant?" and came about following various complaints made by civil rights groups and government officials.

Some of their activists, like Benigno Gallardo, do feel their communities lack "recognition and differentiation", by what he calls "mainstream Mexican culture".

== History ==
Most Africans were brought to Mexico by Portuguese and British slave traders in the sixteenth through eighteenth centuries. The Afro-Mexican population expanded through intermarriage and interracial relationships so that by the end of the eighteenth century, there were more than 370,000 persons of African descent in Mexico, about 10% of the whole population.

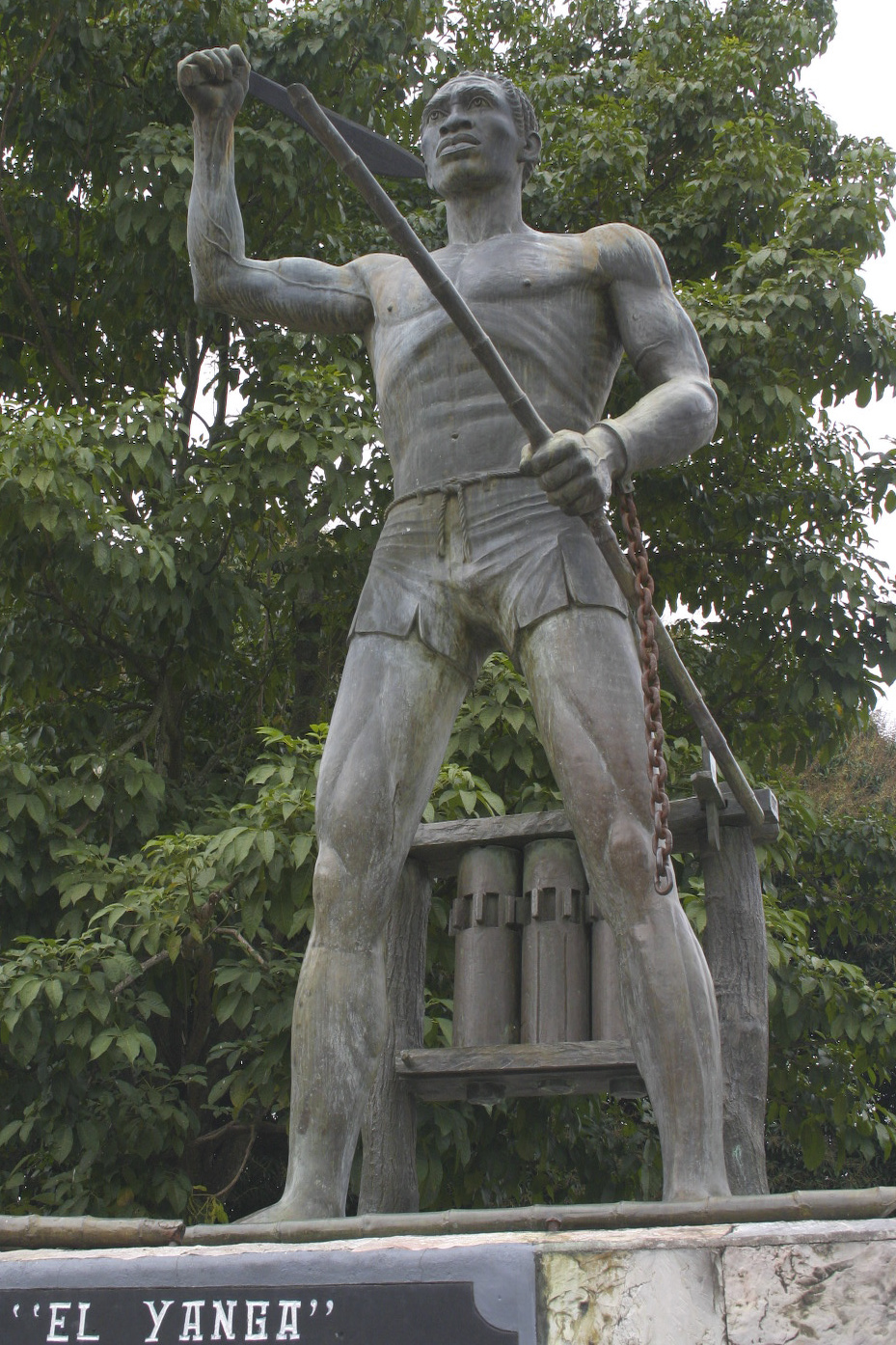
Monument to Gaspar Yanga, founder of the first free town of escaped slaves in North America. The settlement is now known as Yanga, Veracruz.

Afro-Mexicans engaged in a variety of economic activities as enslaved and free persons. Mexico never became a society based on slavery, as happened in the Anglo-American southern colonies or Caribbean islands, where plantations utilized large numbers of field slaves. At conquest, central Mexico had a large, hierarchically organized Indian population that provided largely coerced labor. Mexico's economy utilized African slave labor during the colonial period, particularly in Spanish cities as domestic workers, artisans, and laborers in textile workshops (obrajes).

Although Mexico has celebrated its mixed indigenous and European roots mestizaje, Africans' presence and contributions until recently were not part of the national discourse. Increasingly, the historical record has been revised to take account of Afro-Mexicans' long presence in Mexico.

=== Geographical origins and the Atlantic slave trade ===
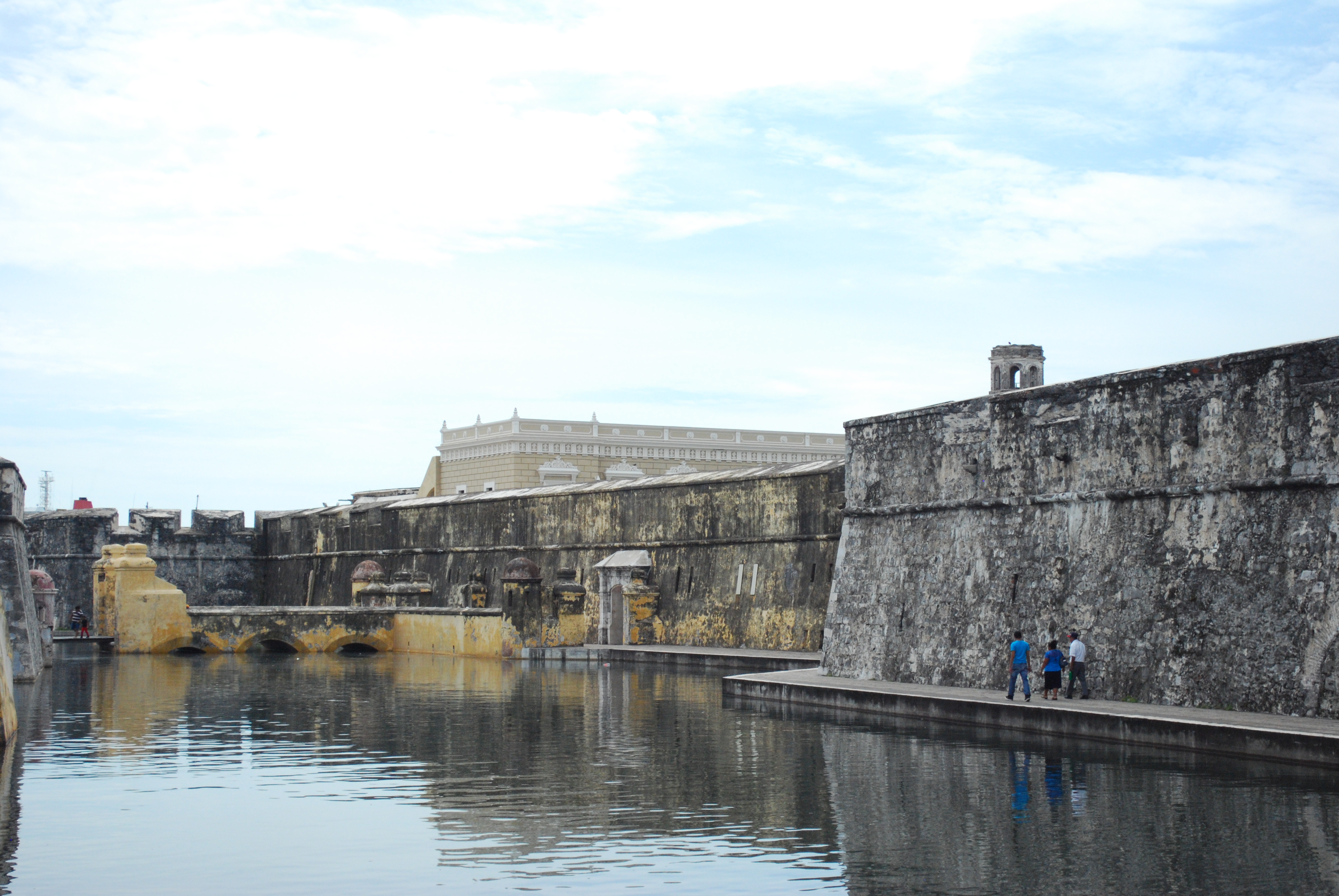
Parts of the fort complex at San Juan de Ulúa were built by enslaved West Africans and indigenous Mexicans. In 2017, the fort and the town of Yanga were declared "Sites of Memory" by INAH and UNESCO as part of The Slave Route Project.

Although Spanish subjects were not allowed to partake in the Atlantic slave trade, the asiento de negros (a monopoly contract issued by the Spanish Crown to other European nations to supply enslaved Africans to Spain's colonies in the Americas) ensured a significant Black presence in Spanish America, including Mexico. Over 100,000 Africa captives had been brought between 1521 and 1646, during the era of the Portuguese asiento, and smaller but significant numbers arrived under the Grillo and Lomelín monopoly. The British South Sea Company trafficked at least 75,000 additional African captives to Mexico between 1714 and 1739.

During the 16th century, the vast majority of African captives in New Spain likely originated from West Africa in the regions of modern day Senegal, The Gambia, and Guinea-Bissau, where the Spanish Empire managed to establish trading with Mande-speaking Muslim communities. According to the genetic testing company 23andMe, the predominant Sub-Saharan ancestry in Mexico is from the Senegambia and Guinea region. In the 17th century, the majority of enslaved peoples likely came from West-Central Africa, primarily from the regions of modern-day Angola.

The demand for slaves came in the early colonial period, especially between 1580 and 1640, when the indigenous population declined due to new infectious diseases. Carlos V began to issue an increasing number of contracts (asientos) between the Spanish Crown and private slavers specifically to bring Africans to Spanish colonies. These slavers made deals with the Portuguese, who controlled the African slave market. Mexico had important slave ports in the New World, sometimes holding slaves brought by Spanish before they were sent to other parts of Latin America and the Caribbean.

=== Conquest and early colonial eras ===
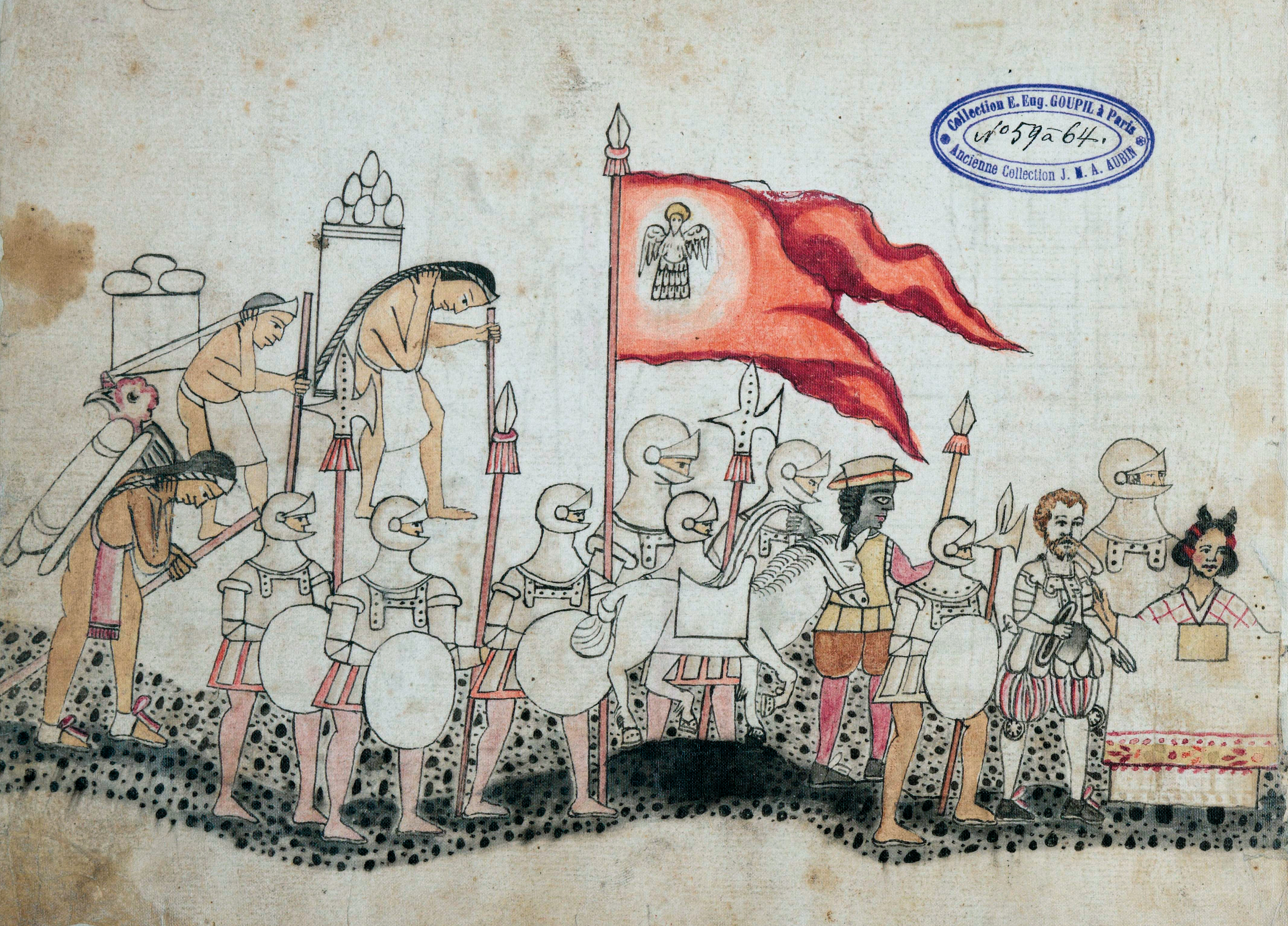
Spanish conquistadors led by Hernán Cortés. The Spaniards are accompanied by native porters, Malinche and a black man who may be Juan Garrido. Codex Azcatitlan.

Africans were brought to Mexico by Spanish conquistadors and were auxiliaries in the conquest. One is shown in Codex Azcatitlan as part of the entourage of conqueror Hernán Cortés. In the account of the conquest of the Aztec Empire compiled by Franciscan Bernardino de Sahagún, Nahua informants noted the presence of Africans with kinky, curly hair in contrast to the straight "yellow" and black hair of the Spaniards. Mexican anthropologist Gonzalo Aguirre Beltrán counted six Blacks who took part in the Spanish conquest of the Aztec Empire. Notable among them was Juan Garrido, a free Black soldier born in Africa, Christianized in Portugal, who participated in the conquest of Tenochtitlan and Western Mexico. The slave of another conquistador, Pánfilo de Narváez, has been blamed for the transmission of smallpox to Nahuas in 1520. Early slaves were likely personal servants or concubines of their Spanish masters, who had been brought to Spain first and came with the conquistadors.

While a number of indigenous people were enslaved during the conquest period, indigenous slavery as an institution was forbidden by the crown except in the cases of rebellion. Indigenous labor was coerced in the early period, mobilized by the encomienda, private grants to individual Spaniards, was the initial workforce, with black overseers often supervising indigenous laborers. Franciscan Toribio de Benavente Motolinia (1482–1568), who arrived in Mexico in 1524 to evangelize the Nahuas, considered Blacks the "Fourth Plague" (in the manner of Biblical plagues) on Mexican Natives. He wrote "In the first years these Black overseers were so absolute in their maltreatment of the Indians, over-loading them, sending them far from their land and giving them many other tasks that many Indians died because of them and at their hands, which is the worst feature of the situation." In Yucatán, there were regulations attempting to prevent Blacks presence in indigenous communities. In Puebla, 1536 municipal regulations attempted to prevent Blacks from going into the open-air market tianguis and harming indigenous women there, mandating fines and fifty lashes in the plaza. In Mexico City in 1537, a number of blacks were accused of rebellion. They were executed in the main plaza (zócalo) by hanging, an event recorded in an indigenous pictorial and alphabetic manuscript.

Once the military phase of conquest was completed in central Mexico, Spanish colonists in Puebla de los Ángeles, which was the second largest Spanish settlement in Mexico, sought enslaved African women for domestic work, such as cooks and laundresses. Ownership of domestic slaves was a status symbol for Spaniards and the dowries of wealthy Spanish women included enslaved Africans.

=== Legal status in the colonial era ===
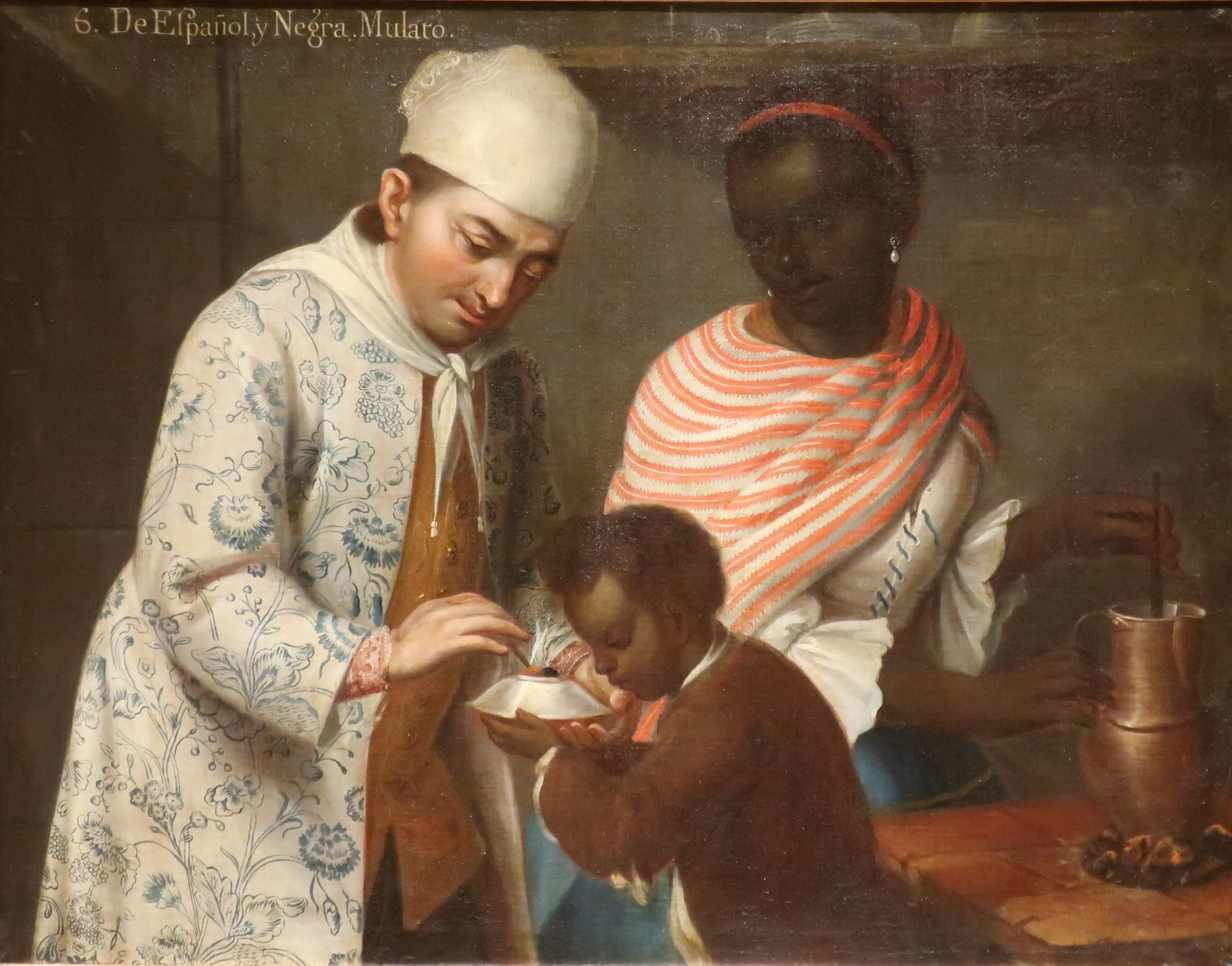
Casta painting of a Spaniard, a Negra and a Mulatto. José de Alcíbar. 18th c.

Blacks classified as part of the "Republic of Spaniards" (República de Españoles), that is the Hispanic sector of Europeans, Africans, and mixed-race castas, while the indigenous were members of the "Republic of Indians" (República de Indios), and under the protection of the Spanish crown. Although there was coming to be an association between Blackness and enslavement, there were Africans who achieved the formal status of vecino (resident, citizen), a designation of great importance in colonial society. In Puebla de los Ángeles, a newly founded settlement for Spaniards, a small number of Black men achieved this status. One free Black, the town crier Juan de Montalvo, was well established and in Puebla, with connections to the local Spanish elites. Others were known to hold land and engage in the local real estate market.

Free Blacks and Mulattoes (descendants of Europeans and Africans) were subject to the payment of tribute to the crown, as were Indians. However, in contrast to Indians, free Blacks as Spaniards and mulattoes were subject to the jurisdiction of the Holy Office of the Inquisition. Legal freedom could be achieved by manumission, with liberty purchased by the enslaved person. A 1585 deed of emancipation (Carta de libertad) in Mexico City shows that the formerly enslaved woman, Juana, (a negra criolla, i.e., born in Mexico), paid her owner for her freedom with the help of Juana's husband Andrés Moreno. The price of liberty was the large sum of 200 gold pesos. Her former owner, Doña Inéz de León, declared that "it is my will that [Juana] shall be free now and for all time and not subject to servitude. And as such person she may and shall go in whatever parts and places she desires; and may appear in judgment and collect and receive her property and manage and administer her estate; and may make wills and codicils and name heirs and executors; and may act and dispose of her person in whatsoever a free person, born of free parents may and must do."

=== Slave resistance ===
Black slave rebellions occurred in Mexico as in other parts of the Americas, with one in Veracruz in 1537 and another in the Spanish capital of Mexico City. Runaway slaves were called cimarrones, who mostly fled to the highlands between Veracruz and Puebla, with a number making their way to the Costa Chica region in what are now Guerrero and Oaxaca. UNESCO wrote a book which spoke about the history of the slave trade and the ways in which Latin America was involved. In the chapter titled "The slave trade in the Caribbean and Latin America" they mention that Spain's biggest goal was to explore "newly discovered tropical territories" in order to help them gain resources and generate wealth and power. In this chapter, they also mention different reasons as to why the slave trade developed along the coasts.

Runaways in Veracruz formed settlements called palenques which would fight off Spanish authorities. The most famous of these was led by Gaspar Yanga. Gaspar Yanga entered Mexico because he was a slave who was working in the sugar plantains in Orizaba during the year of 1540. Yanga was able to escape this plantation in the year of 1579 and he left to hide in the mountains. There Yanga founded a palenque. The only way that slaves who were in the zone could survive was by following each other's lead. The more slaves that heard about Yanga and his escape, they would create groups and would plan to escape the plantations their Spanish owners created. Their leader was Yanga. Since Yanga and his followers had created a community in the mountains and they knew that the Spaniards only used certain roads to transport goods, they planned to rob them. Yangas followers would often hide and wait until the Spanish men would be passing by certain spots and rob their goods, eventually, the Spaniards became afraid. The Spanish then declared war with Yanga and his followers and they lost, so freedom was granted to Yanga and his army. With Yanga winning this war, he was able to speak and demand land from Spanish authorities, he wanted his people to have a town of their own which was first known as "San Lorenzo de los Negros" but then became the municipality of Yanga, Veracruz, the first community of free Blacks in the Americas.

=== Free Black communities in colonial Mexico ===
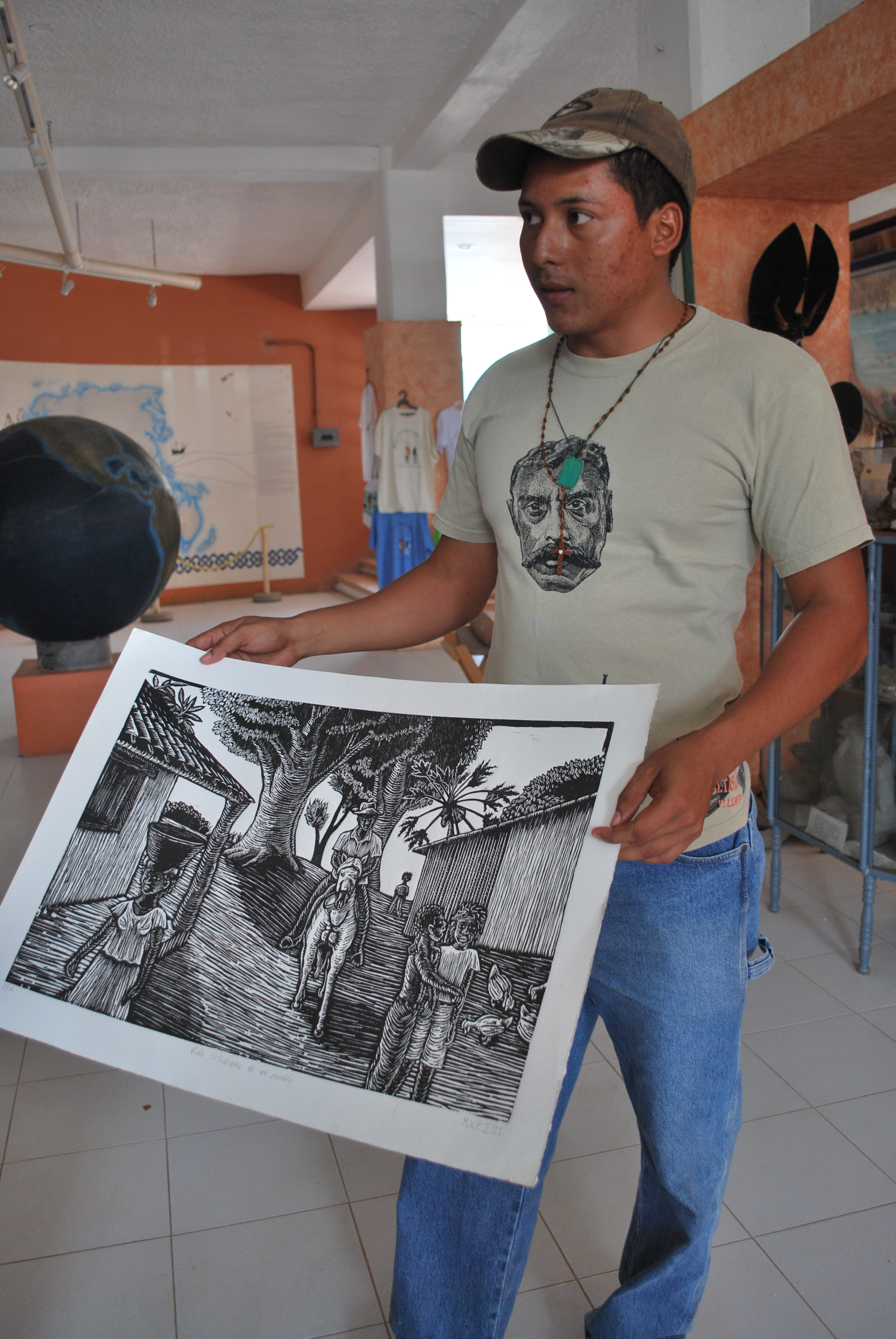
Artist Ramiro Victor Paz Jimenez demonstrating work at the Museo de las Culturas Afromestizas in Cuajinicuilapa, Guerrero

By the 17th century, the free Black population already outnumbered the enslaved population, despite slavery being at its greatest extent in the colony during this time. Creoles and mulattos occupied a legible social presence in Mexico by 1600. Most enslaved Africans were reportedly "from the land of Angola," who reconfigured African culture in colonial Mexico while complimenting the existing presence of creoles. Scholar Herman L. Bennet records that 17th-century colonial Mexico was "home to the most diverse Black population in the Americas."

Mexico City, built on the ruins of the Mexica capital city of Tenochtitlan became the center for diverse communities, all of which served the wealthy Spaniards as "artisans, domestic servants, day laborers, and slaves". This population included "impoverished Spaniards, conquered but differentiated Indians, enslaved Africans (ladinos, individuals who were linguistically conversant in Castilian, and bozales, individuals directly from Guinea, or Africa, who were unable to speak Castilian), and the new hybrid populations (mestizos, mulatos, and zambos, persons with both Indian and African heritage)." Catholic Spaniards instituted ecclesiastical raids beginning in 1569 upon these communities in order to maintain order and ensure the gendered and conjugal norms that they, including persons of African descent, "could assume in the Christian commonwealth."

Since there were no official census records in the 17th century, the exact size of the free Black population in Mexico remains unknown; however, Bennet concludes, based on numerous sources of the period, that there was an "extensive free Black presence early in the 17th century." In the 17th century, because of forced indoctrination instituted by Spanish colonizers, Christian beliefs, rituals, and practices were already becoming normalized by a substantial population of Black creoles in colonial Mexico, similar to the Indigenous and mestizo population – "it sought to distance Indians and Africans from their former collectivities, traditions, and pasts that had sanctioned their former selves. Such distancing was both a stated and implicit objective of masters and colonial authorities." In 1640, the regular slave trade to colonial Mexico ended.

==== Effects of Nationalism ====
The Mexican nationalist movement, which fueled the Mexican War of Independence from 1810 to 1821, was predicated on the ideological notion that Mexico possessed a unique cultural tradition – a notion which was denied by European imperial elites who asserted that Mexico lacked any basis for nationhood – and resulted in the purposeful erasure of a Black presence from Mexico's history. Scholar Herman L. Bennet states that "the demands of a previous political movement should no longer sanction the ideological practices that historically excluded the Black past and presently confines it to the margins of history," likening this erasure to an act of "ethnic cleansing."

=== Afro-Mexicans and the Catholic Church ===
Catholicism shaped life among the vast majority of Africans in colonial society. Enslaved Blacks were simultaneously members of the Christian community and chattel, private property of their owners. In general, the church did not take a stance against African slavery as institution. However, Dominican friar Bartolomé de las Casas campaigned against their forced serviture later in life; further, the second archbishop of Mexico, Alonso de Montúfar, argued against the practice. Montúfar condemned the transatlantic slave trade and sought its cessation and viewed the benefits of incorporating Africans into Christianity as slave not equal to the cost to rending their ties to family in Africa. His pleas and condemnations were ignored.

Church records of baptisms, marriages, burials, and of the Inquisition indicate a high level of the church's formal engagement with Africans. Enslaved and free Africans were full members of the church. As the African population was increased with the importation of unacculturated slaves (bozales), white elites became concerned with controlling slaves' behavior and maintaining Christian orthodoxy. With the establishment of the Inquisition in 1571, Africans appeared before the tribunal in disproportionate numbers. Although Frank Tannenbaum posits that the church intervened in master-slave relations for humanitarian reasons, Herman L. Bennett argues that the church was more interested in regulating and controlling Africans in the religious sphere. When the Spanish crown allowed bozales to be imported to its overseas territories, it saw Christian marriage as a way to control the enslaved. The church intervened in favor of enslaved individuals over the objections of their masters in marital choice and conjugal rights. Slaves learned how to shape these religious protections to challenge masters' authority through canon law, thereby undermining masters' absolute control over their enslaved property. For the church, the slaves' Christian identity was more important than their status as chattel. Baptismal and marriage records provide information about ties within the Afro-Mexican community between parents, god parents, and witnesses to the sacraments.

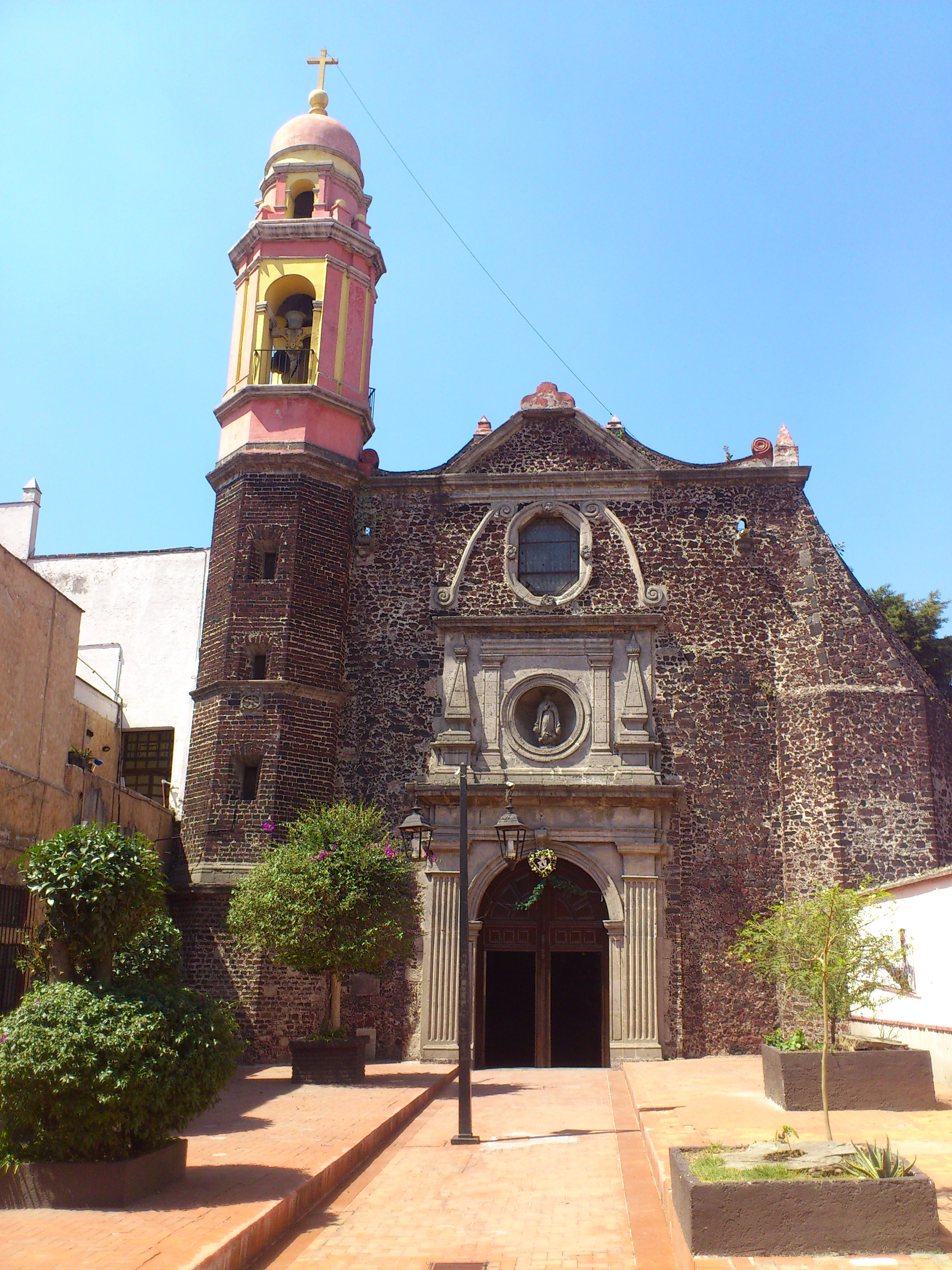
The parish church of Santa María la Redonda, which was associated with one of the fourteen known confraternities in Mexico City. Called the Coronación de Cristo y San Benito de Palermo, the confraternity later met at the Convent of San Francisco.

Blacks and afromestizos formed and joined religious confraternities, lay brotherhoods under the supervision of the church, which became religious and social spaces to reinforce ties of individuals to larger community. These organized groups of lay men and women, were sanctioned by the Roman Catholic Church, gave their activities legitimacy in Spanish colonial society. These black confraternities were often funded by Spaniards and by the church hierarchy and were actually largely supported by Spaniards. And although this support of the confraternities on the part of Spaniards and the Church was indeed an attempt to maintain moral control over the African population, the members of the confraternities were able to use these brotherhoods and sisterhoods to maintain and develop their existing identities. A notable example of this is the popularity of choosing African saints, such as St. Efigenia, as the patron of the confraternity, a clear claim of African legitimacy for all Africans.

African descent people found in these confraternities ways to maintain parts of their African culture alive through the use of what was socially available to them. Particularly in the baroque Christianity popular at the time and the festivals that took place in this spiritual environment, mainly public religious festivals. This fervor culminated in acts of flagellation, especially around the time of holy week, as a sign of great humility and willing suffering, which in turn, brought an individual closer to Jesus. This practice would eventually diminish and face criticism from Bishops due to the fact that often the anonymity and violent nature of this public act of piety could lead, and may have led, to indiscriminate violence. The participation in processions are another quite important and dramatic way that these confraternities expressed their piety. This was a way for the Black community to show off their material wealth that had been acquired through the confraternity, usually in the form of saint statues, candles, carved lambs with silver diadems, and other various valuable religious artifacts.

The use of an African female saint, St Ephigenia, is also a claim to the legitimacy of a distinctly female identity. This is significant because the Afro-Mexican confraternity offered a space where typical Spanish patriarchy could be flipped. The confraternities offered women a place where they could adopt leadership positions and authority through positions of mayordomas and madres in the confraternity, often even holding founder's status. Status as a member of a confraternity also gave Black women a sense of respectability in the eyes of Spanish society. Going as far, in some cases, as to grant legal privileges when being examined and tried by the Inquisition. They also took up the responsibility of providing basic medical services as nurses. Women were often in charge of acquiring funding for the confraternity through limosnas (alms), a form of charity, because they were, evidently, better at it than the men. That being said, some Spanish heritage women that were wealthy decided to fund some of these confraternities directly. This establishment of wealth also led to a shift in tendencies in female empowerment and involvement in confraternities in the 18th century. This shift was essentially a Hispanicization of the male members of the confraternity which may have involved an adoption of the Spanish system of patriarchy. This pattern, roughly in the 18th century, led to a policing of female members in order to better comply with Spanish gender norms. The Hispanicization of the confraternities gradually led from a transfer in racial title from de negros, "of Blacks," to despues españoles, "later Spanish." This is in large part due to the fact that "Socioeconomic factors had become more important than race in determining rank by the end of the eighteenth century".

Religious institutions also owned Black slaves, including the landed estates of the Jesuits as well as urban convents and individual nuns.

=== Economic activity ===
Important economic sectors such as sugar production and mining relied heavily on slave labor during that time. After 1640, slave labor became less important but the reasons are not clear. The Spanish Crown cut off contacts with Portuguese slave traders after Portugal gained its independence. Slave labor declined in mining as the high profit margins allowed the recruitment of wage labor. In addition, the indigenous and mestizo population increased, and with them the size of the free labor force. In the later colonial period, most slaves continued to work in sugar production but also in textile mills, which were the two sectors that needed a large, stable workforce. Neither could pay enough to attract free laborers to its arduous work. Slave labor remained important to textile production until the later 18th century when cheaper British textiles were imported.

Although integral to certain sectors of the economy through the mid-18th century, the number of slaves and the prices they fetched fell during the colonial period. Slave prices were highest from 1580 to 1640 at about 400 pesos. It decreased to about 350 pesos around 1650, staying constant until falling to about 175 pesos for an adult male in 1750. In the latter 18th century, mill slaves were phased out and replaced by indigenous, often indebted, labor. Slaves were nearly non-existent in the late colonial census of 1792. While banned shortly after the beginning of the Mexican War of Independence, the practice did not definitively end until 1829.

=== Afro-Mexicans and race mixture ===
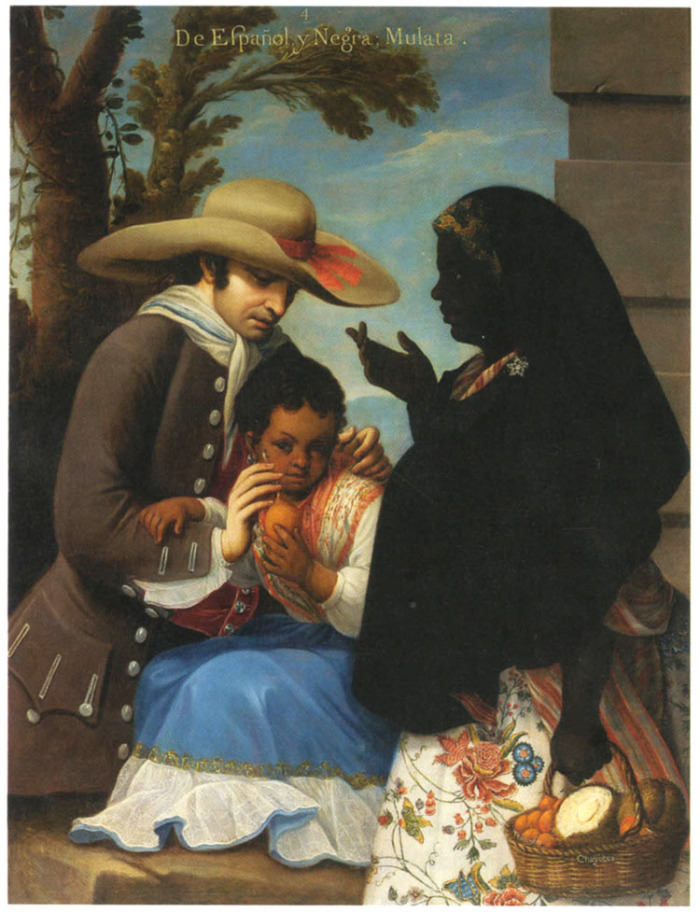
Español (Spaniard) + Negra (black woman), Mulata. Miguel Cabrera. Mexico 1763

From early in the colonial period, African and African-descended people had offspring with Europeans or indigenous people. This led to an elaborate set of racial terms for mixtures which appeared during the 18th century. The offspring of mixed-race couples was divided into three general groups: Mestizo for (Spanish) White/indigenous, Mulatto for (Spanish) White/Black and Lobo "wolf" or Zambo, sometimes used as a synonym; and Zambaigo for Black/Indigenous. However, there was overlap in these categories which recognized Black mestizos. Black mestizos account for less than 2.5 percent of the Mexican population as of today. In addition, skin tone further divided the mestizo and mulatto categories. This loose hierarchical system of classification is sometimes called the sistema de castas, although its existence has recently been questioned as a 20th-century ideological construct. Las castas paintings were produced during the 18th centuries, commissioned by the King of Spain to reflect Mexican society at that time. They portray the three races (European, Indigenous and African), and their complicated mixing. They are based on family groups, with parents and children labeled according to their caste. They have 16 squares in a hierarchy.

==== Gallery of Afro-Mexican casta paintings ====
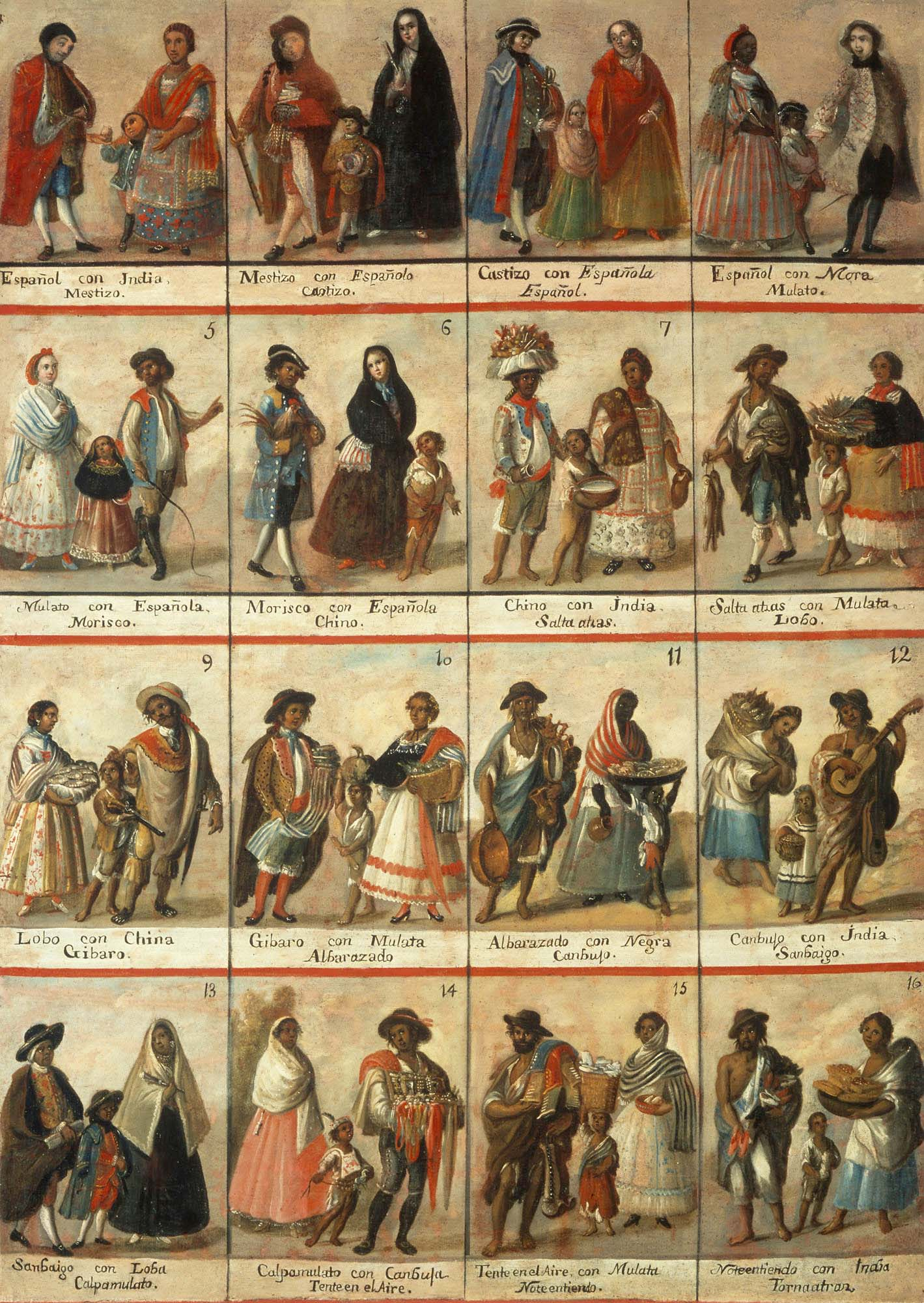
Castas painting showing the various race combinations.

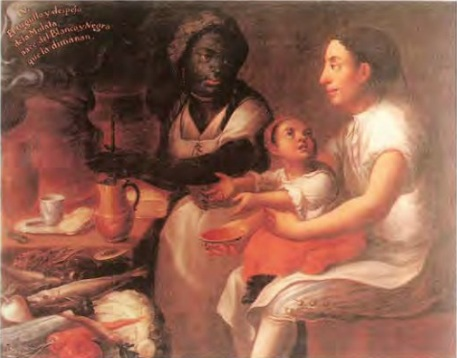
Español, Negra, Mulatta José Joaquín Magón.

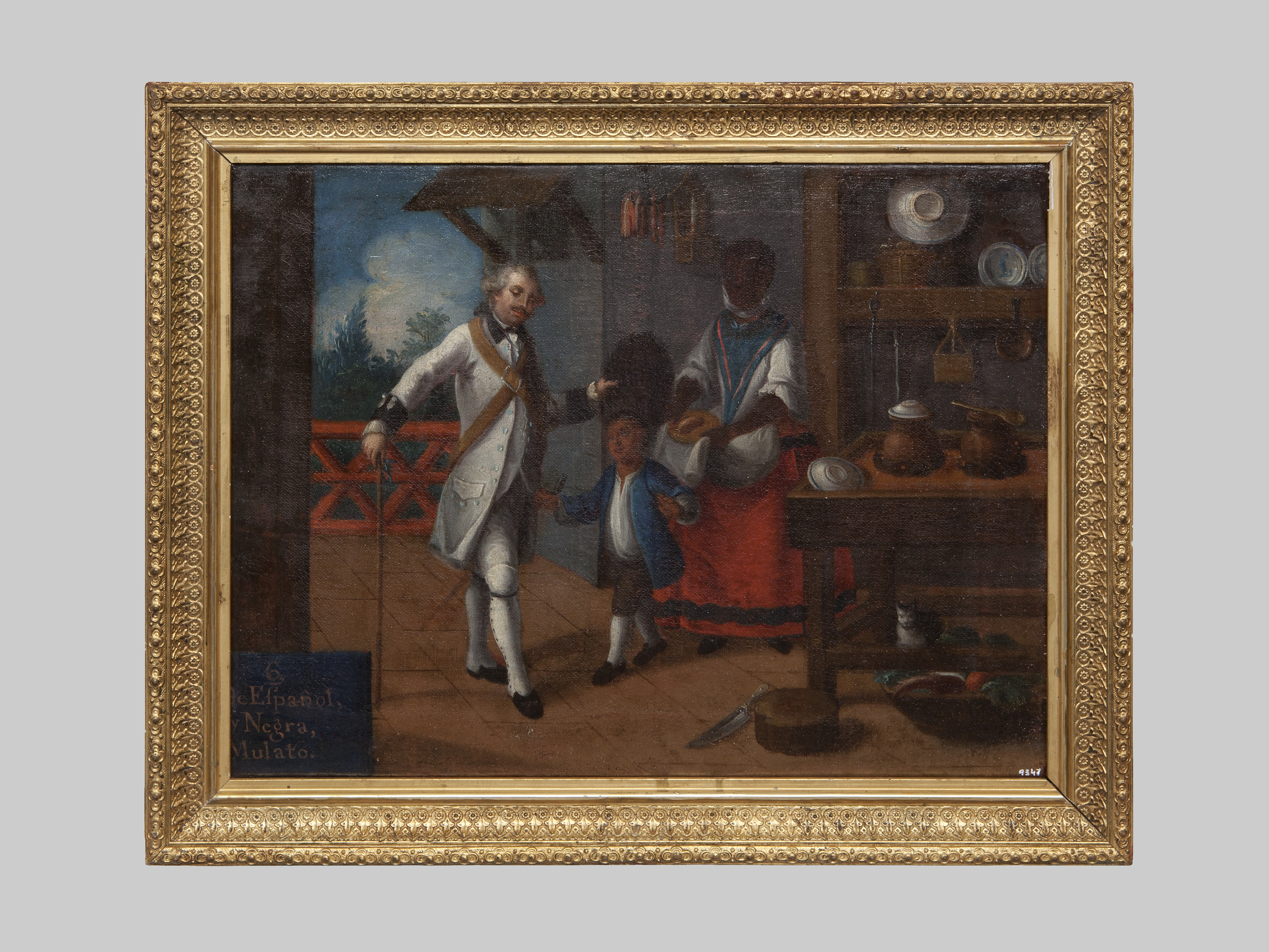
From Español and Negra, Mulato. Anon. 18th c. Mexico.

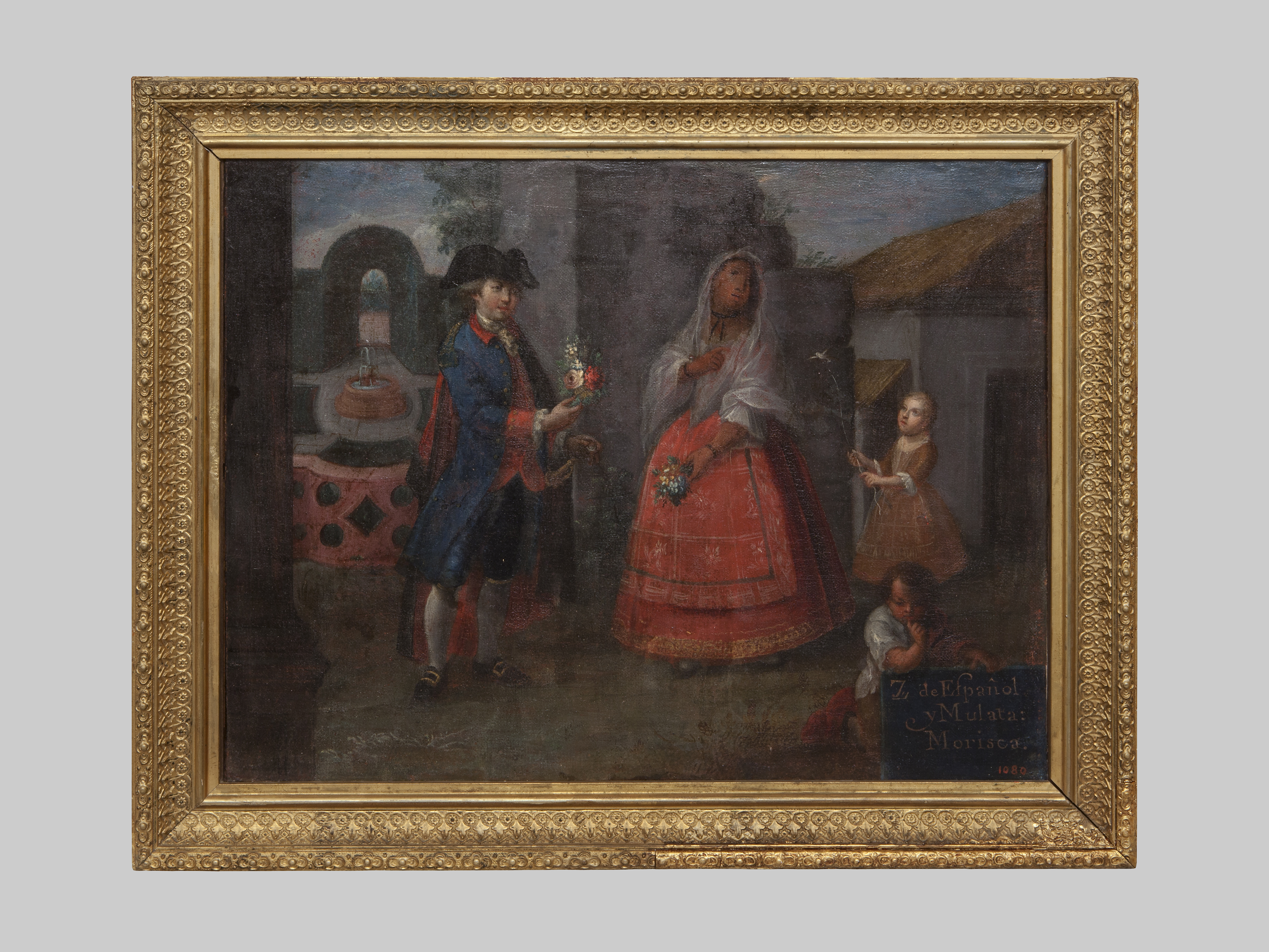
De Español y Mulata, Morisca. Anon. 18th c. Mexico.

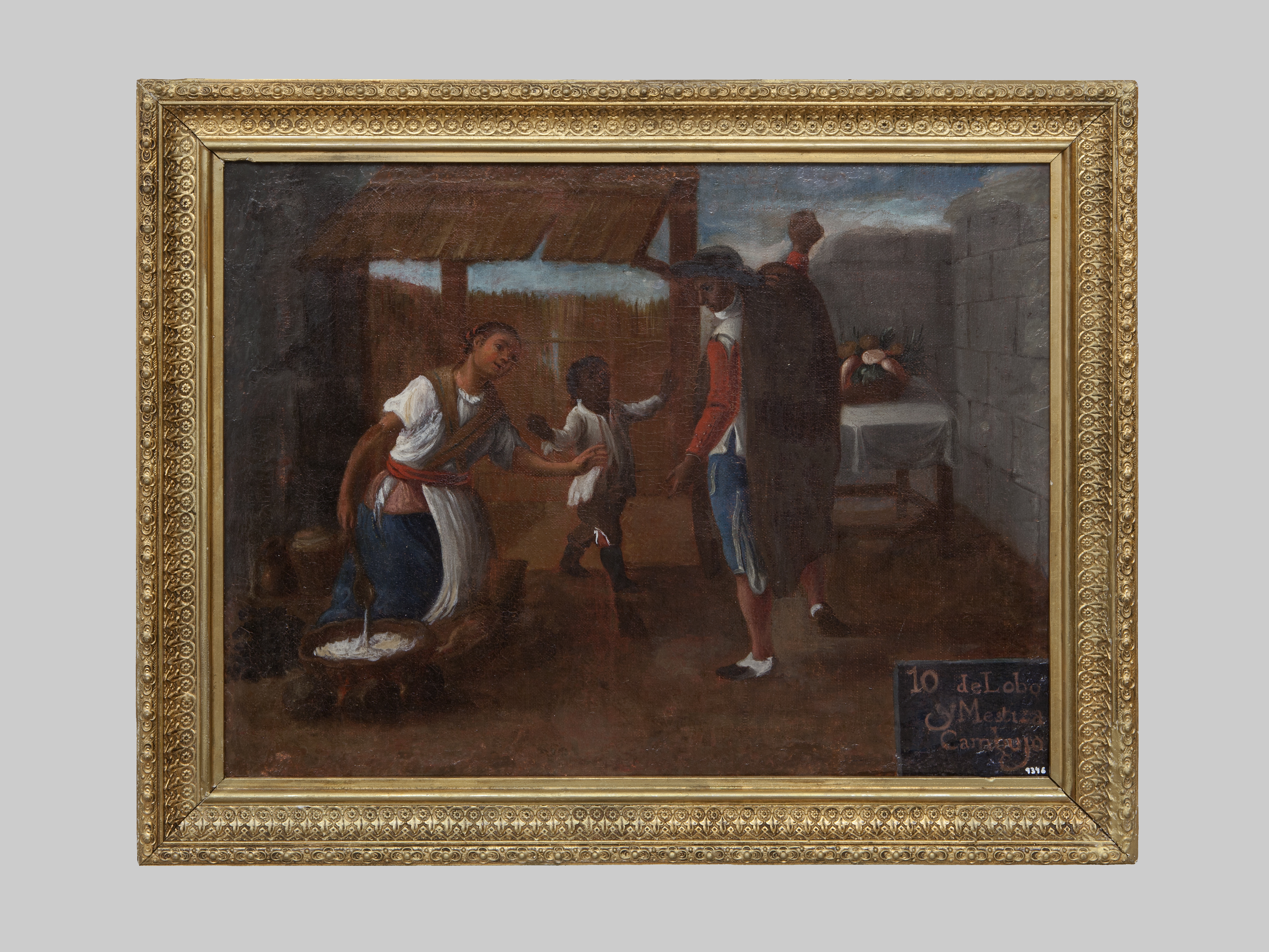
Lobo y Mestiza, Cambujo. Anon. 18th c.

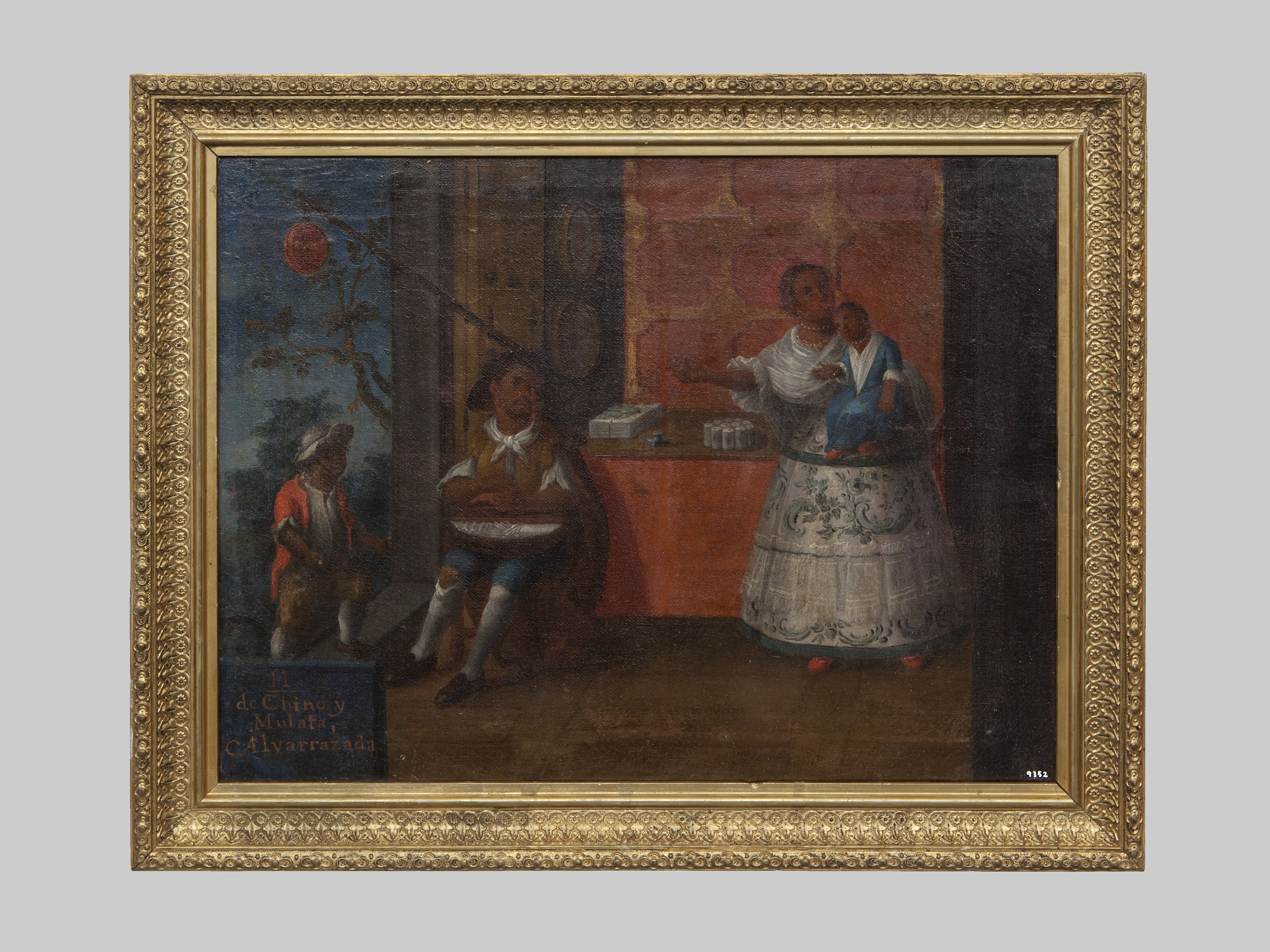
De Chino y Mulata, Alvarazada. Anon. 18th c.

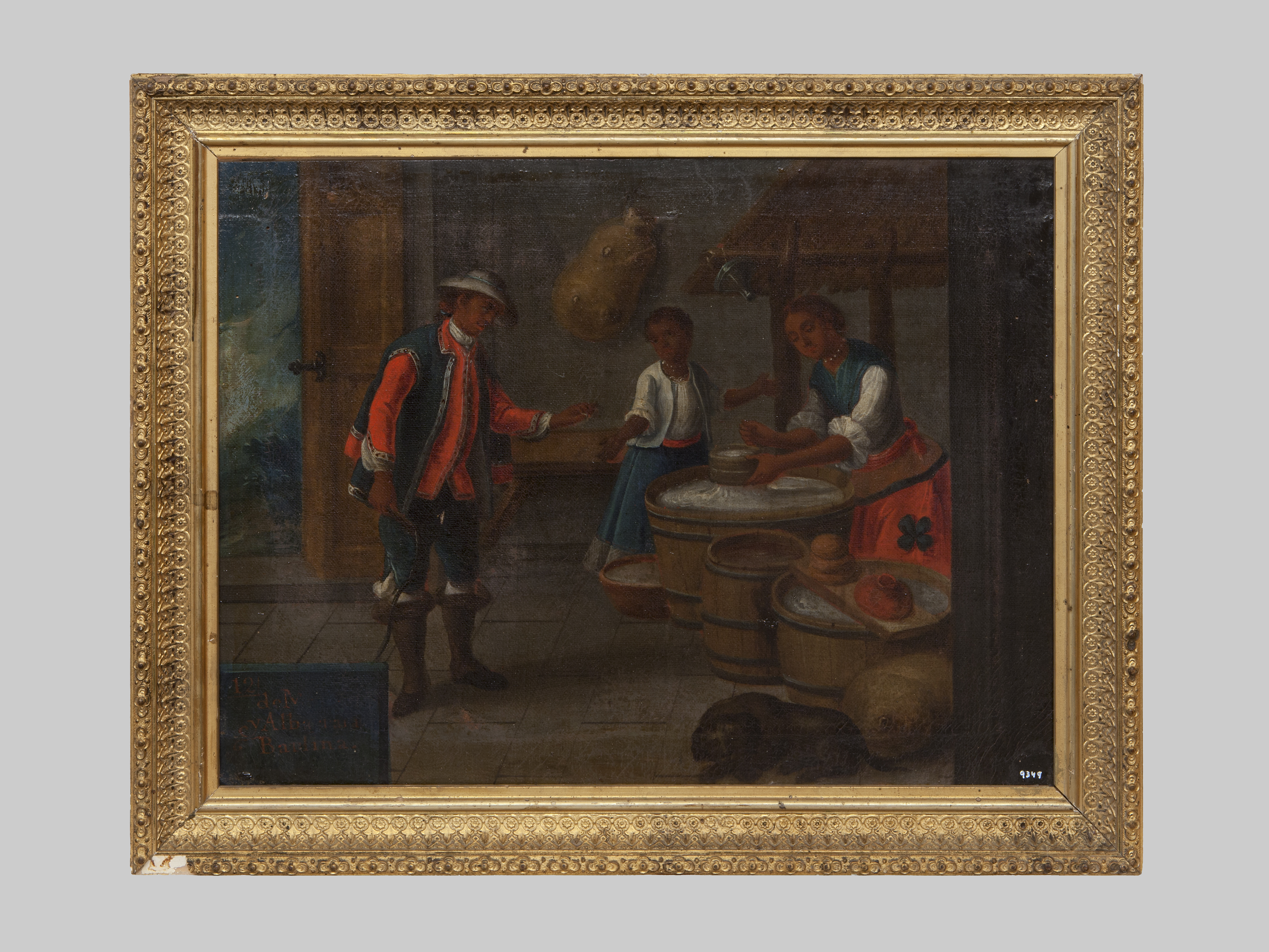
De Mestizo y Albarazada, Barsina. Anon. 18th c.

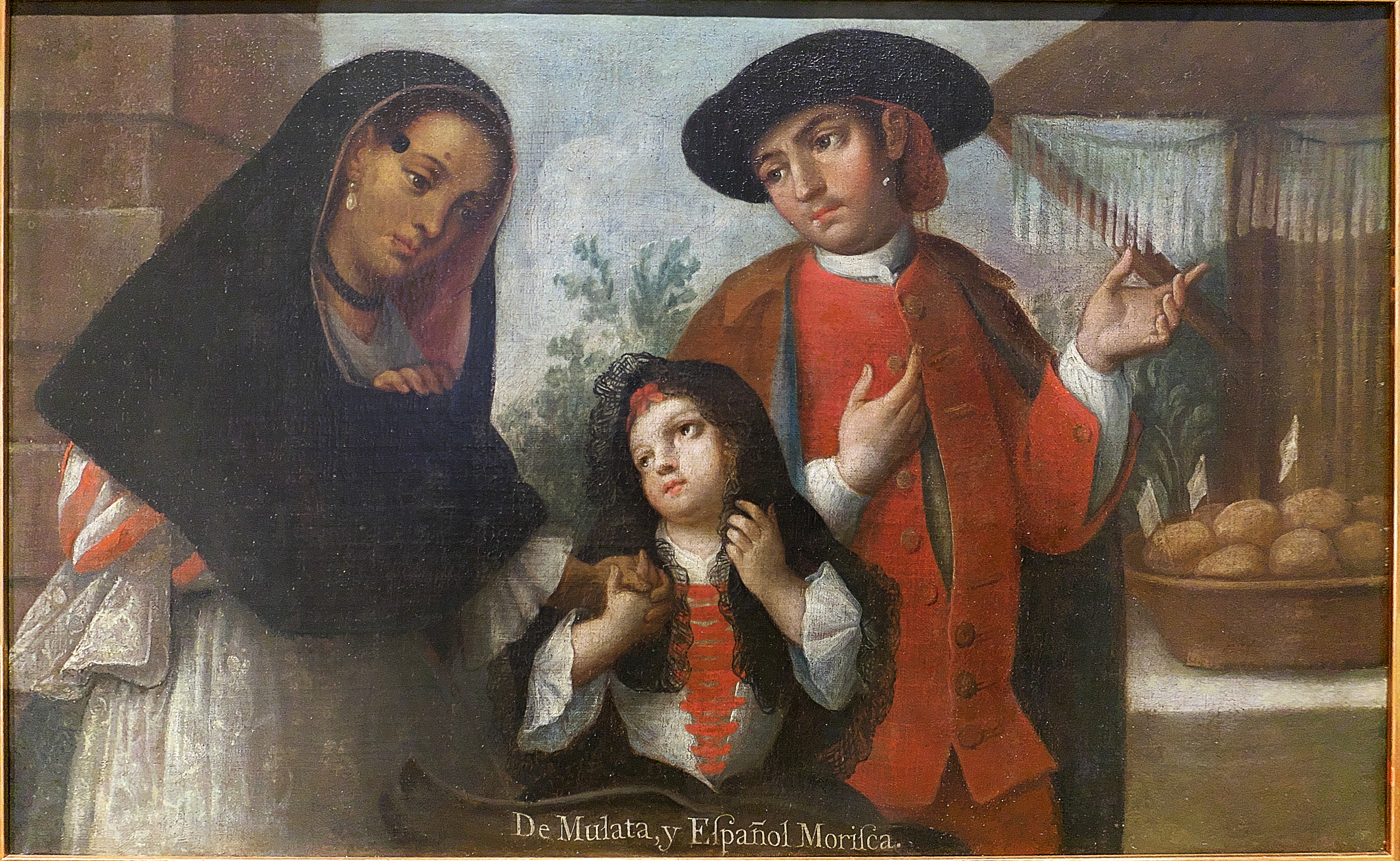
From Mulata and Español, Morisca, Juan Patricio Morlete Ruiz. 18th c. Mexico.

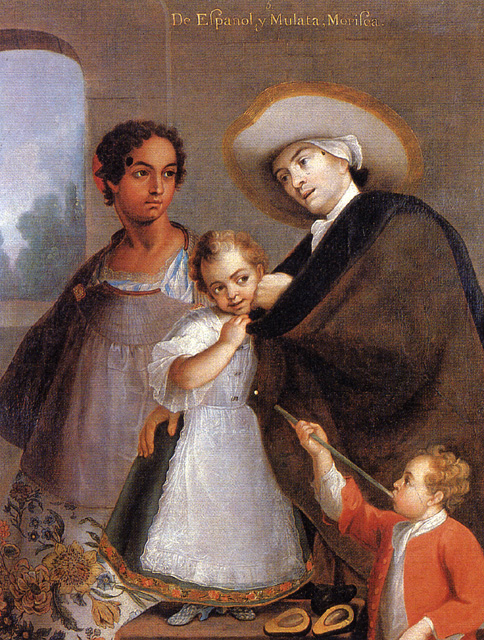
"From male Spaniard and Mulatta: Morisca". Miguel Cabrera, 18th c. Mexico.

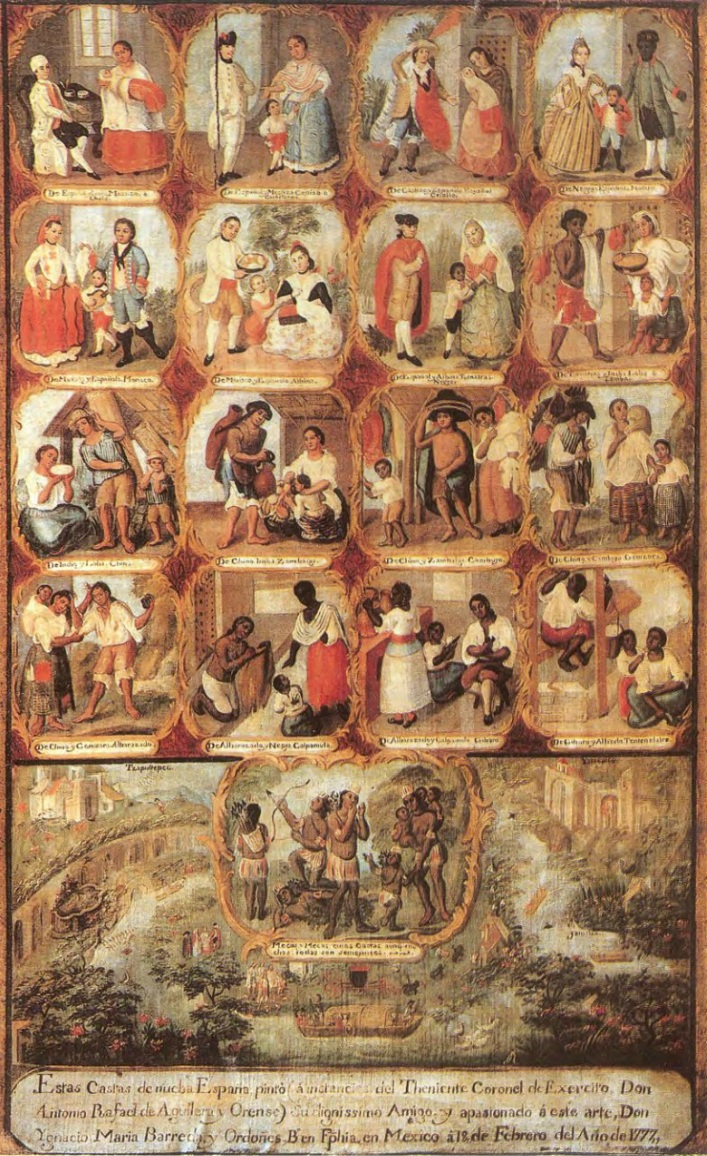
Las castas mexicanas. Ignacio Maria Barreda. 1777.

=== Afro-Mexicans and Mexican independence ===
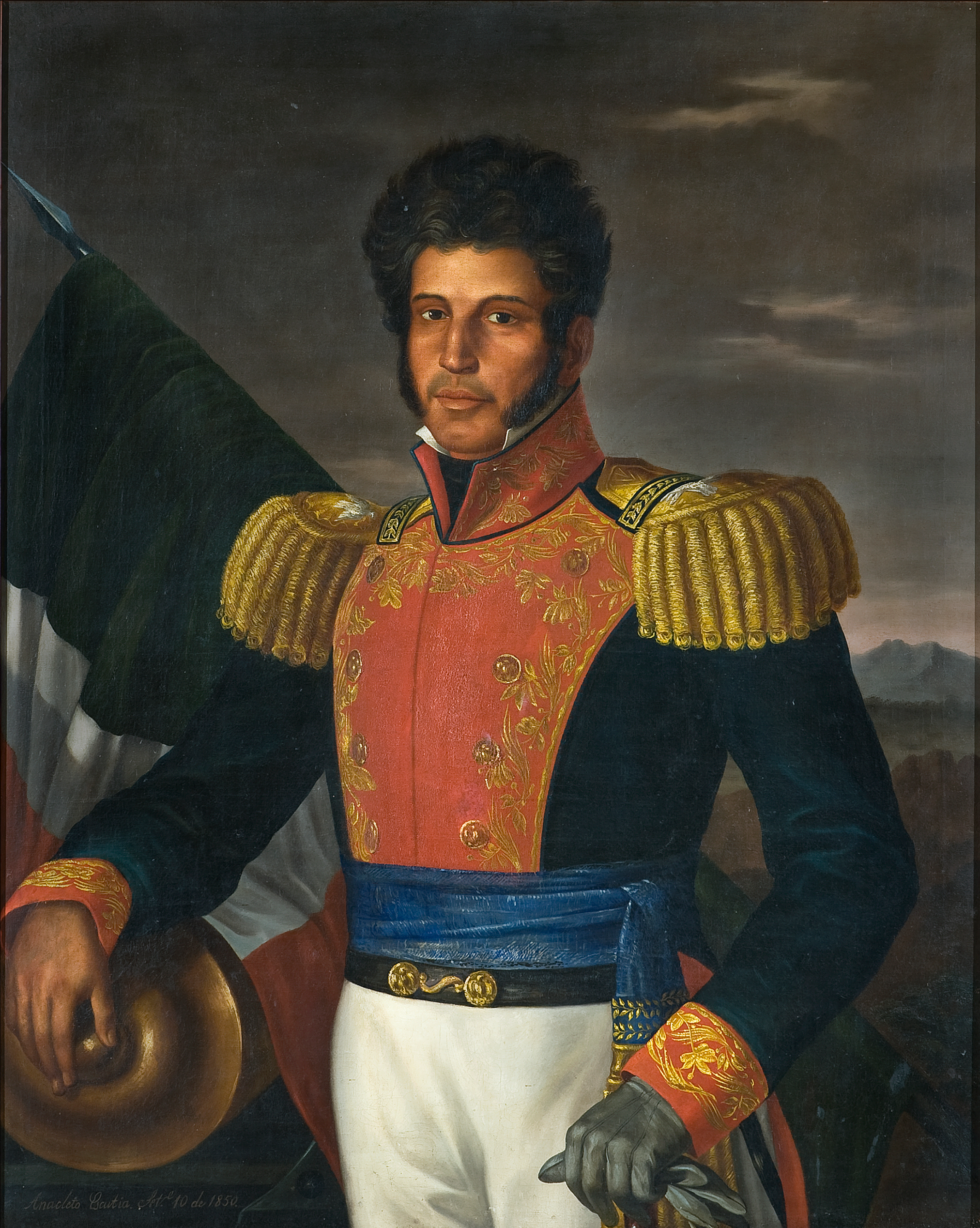
Insurgent Vicente Guerrero is said to have had African ancestry.

The armed insurgency for independence broke out in September 1810 was led by the American Spanish secular priest Miguel Hidalgo y Costilla. Hidalgo did not articulate a coherent program for independence, but in an early proclamation condemned slavery and the slave trade, and called for the abolition of tributes, which were paid by Indians, blacks, mulattoes and castas. He mandated in November 1810 that "slave masters must, whether Americans [New World-born] or Europeans, give [their slaves] liberty within ten days, on pain of death that their lack of observance of this article will apply to them." Hidalgo was captured, defrocked, and executed in 1811, but his former seminary student, secular priest José María Morelos continued the insurgency for independence. He did articulate a program for independence in the Sentimientos de la Nación at the 1813 Congress of Chilpancingo that also called for the abolition of slavery. Point 15 is "That prohibit slavery forever, as the distinction of caste, being all equal and only vice and virtue distinguish an American from the other." Morelos like Hidalgo was captured and killed, but the struggle for independence continued in the "hot country" of southern Mexico under Vicente Guerrero, who is portrayed as having African roots in modern Mexico. Royalist officer Agustín de Iturbide had fought the insurgents changed his allegiance, but later fought for independence. He gained the trust of Guerrero and the Plan de Iguala, named for the city in the hot country where it was proclaimed, laid out the aims of the insurgency, calling for independence, the primacy of Catholicism, and monarchy, with point 12 mandating "All inhabitants of the Empire, without any distinction other than merit and virtue, are citizens fit for whatever employment they choose." The alliance Guerrero and Iturbide led to the formation of the Army of the Three Guarantees. Spanish imperial rule collapsed, and Mexico gained its independence in September 1821. Despite political independence, abolition of slavery did not come about until Guerrero became President of Mexico in 1829.

=== Conflict with the US over the expansion of slavery ===
Although Mexico did not abolish slavery immediately after independence, the expansion of Anglo-American settlement in Texas with their Black slaves became a point of contention between the US and Mexico. The northern territory had been claimed by the Spanish Empire but not settled beyond a few missions. The Mexican government saw a solution to the problem of Indian attacks in the north by inviting immigration by US Americans. Rather than settling in the territory contested by northern Indian groups, the Anglo-Americans and their Black slaves established farming in eastern Texas, contiguous to US territory in Louisiana. Mexican President Anastasio Bustamante, concerned that the US would annex Texas, sought to limit Anglo-American immigration in 1830 and mandated no new slaves in the territory. Texas slave-owner and settler Stephen F. Austin viewed slavery as absolutely necessary to the success of the settlement, and managed to get an exemption from the law. Texas rebelled against the central Mexican government of Antonio López de Santa Anna, gaining its de facto independence in 1836. The Texas Revolution meant the continuation of Black slavery and when Texas was annexed to the US in 1845, it entered the Union as a slave state. However, Mexico refused to acknowledge the independence of the territory until after the Mexican–American War (1846–1848), and the Treaty of Guadalupe Hidalgo drew the border between the two countries. After the ignominious defeat by the US, Mexican President José Joaquín de Herrera sent a bill to congress to create the state of Guerrero, named after the mixed-race hero of independence, from parts of Michoacán, Puebla, and Mexico, in the hot country where the insurgent leader held territory. Mexico became a destination for some Black slaves and mixed-race Black Seminoles fleeing enslavement in the US. They were free once they crossed into Mexican territory.

=== Afro-Mexican visibility in the 20th century ===
Many of the prevailing views on Blackness during the early 20th century held that the race would eventually go extinct through voluntary assimilation. This belief held that Afro-descendant peoples, along with the other races, would eventually combine into a "cosmic race." This cosmic race would have a combination of all the best qualities and would lack the worst qualities of the various races. Due to the stress put on the importance of race mixing and "whitening" oneself, many believed it prudent to simply ignore the Afro-Mexican population and its history as unimportant side notes of their history. Proponents of this theory, like politician José Vasconcelos, would go on to characterize mestizaje, or race mixing, to be between indigenous and white populations; this virtually excluded African descended peoples from the Mexican narrative. Vasconcelos excluded Afro-Mexicans from the "cosmic race" and many post-revolutionary politicians sided with his views on race and mestizaje cementing the prevailing post-revolutionary racial ideologies.

In the beginning of the 20th century, Mexico was known to be a safe haven from racial discrimination, especially to Afro-descended citizens of the United States who would seek refuge there. Notably, famous boxer Jack Johnson fled to Mexico in 1919 and claimed it as a safe haven from racial prejudice. Beginning in 1925, the Mexican Ministry of the Interior began limiting immigration. By the 1930s, some officials were encouraging immigration only from those they deemed to be of good racial backgrounds. Even travel to Mexico was limited and those applying for tourist visas could be denied access to Mexico based on their race until around 1939. This contradicted the image that Mexico wished to present about their racial equality. After international threats of exposing these practices and ruining the Mexican reputation of racial equality, Mexican immigration policy began to change. In 1939, the NAACP issued an official statement that Mexico was no longer discriminating against African-descended citizens of the United States wishing to travel to the country.

Mexican scholars like anthropologist Gonzalo Aguirre Beltrán or caricaturist Miguel Covarrubias helped begin the process of recognizing Mexico's African cultural influences as well as making the populations more visible and relevant. Covarrubias would use his artistic skills to highlight Afro-Mexican cultures in the New Negro Movement of the 1920s and 1930s and to map areas with African cultural influence. He wrote the book, Mexico South: The Isthmus of Tehuantepec, condemning policies that would relegate people of color to a kind of second class citizenship and perpetuate fascist ideologies. Covarrubias held that understanding the history of Africanism in Mexico was a key part of understanding Mexico as a whole. After 1945, Aguirre Beltrán became the leading Mexican scholar on Afro-Mexicans. He wrote the book La Población Negra de Mexico, which helped form the foundations for the study of Afro-Mexicans during the colonial period and their post-revolutionary cultural impacts. Aguirre Beltrán would criticize the colonial caste system and its strict racial categorization and instead propose a system of categorization consisting of the three primary categories of Indomestizo (indigenous descent), Euromestizo (European descent), and Afromestizo (African descent). In the 1940s, the Mexican census began to reflect the rejection of strict racial classes in Mexico as it replaced categorization based on biological race with categories pertaining to identification with certain cultural practices like what kinds of shoes one wore or bread one ate. While this was an attempt to diminish racial tensions and categorization, it was condemned by Aguirre Beltrán because it still failed to recognize Afro-Mexicans and encouraged them to declare themselves as either white or indigenous because many had assimilated into these cultural practices. Even while he was promoting Black visibility, Aguirre Beltrán circulated his ideas that there existed no individuals with pure African heritage in Mexico and that Blackness in isolation was violent and aggressive.

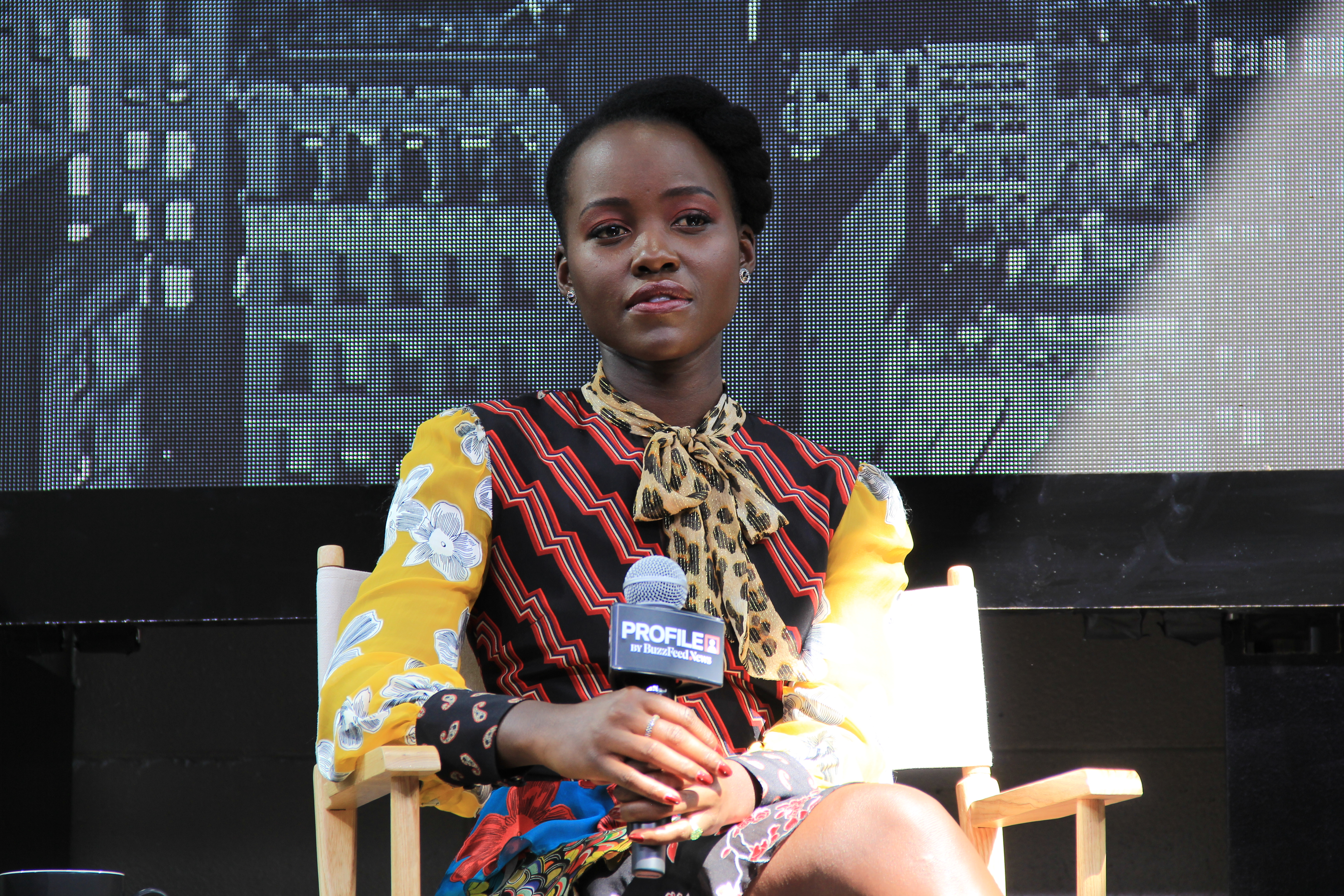
Kenyan-Mexican actress Lupita Nyong'o, whose parents were part of the small wave of 20th-century African migration following the independence of African nations.

During the late 1940s, the question became how to define Afromestizo populations and distinguish them from indigenous communities. Even if one could identify an individual as African-descended by their physical characteristics, they were culturally mixed and could not be easily separated from the larger population by their cultural practices. Black communities in Mexico were being officially recognized by scholars and the existence of Afromestizo populations could no longer be denied. Yet, it was not until 2015 that African descent was added as a census category for official government recognition of Afro-Mexican populations.

== Demography ==
According to the 2020 INEGI census, there were 2,576,213 Mexicans that self-identified as Afro-descendants 2.04-3% of the country's population. Places with large Afro-Mexican communities are: Costa Chica of Guerrero, Costa Chica of Oaxaca and Veracruz. While Northern Mexico has some towns with a minority of Mexicans of African descent. Afro-descendants can be found throughout the country, however they are numerically insignificant in some states. There are also recent immigrants of African and Afro-Caribbean origin.

=== Afro-Mexican population in the Costa Chica ===
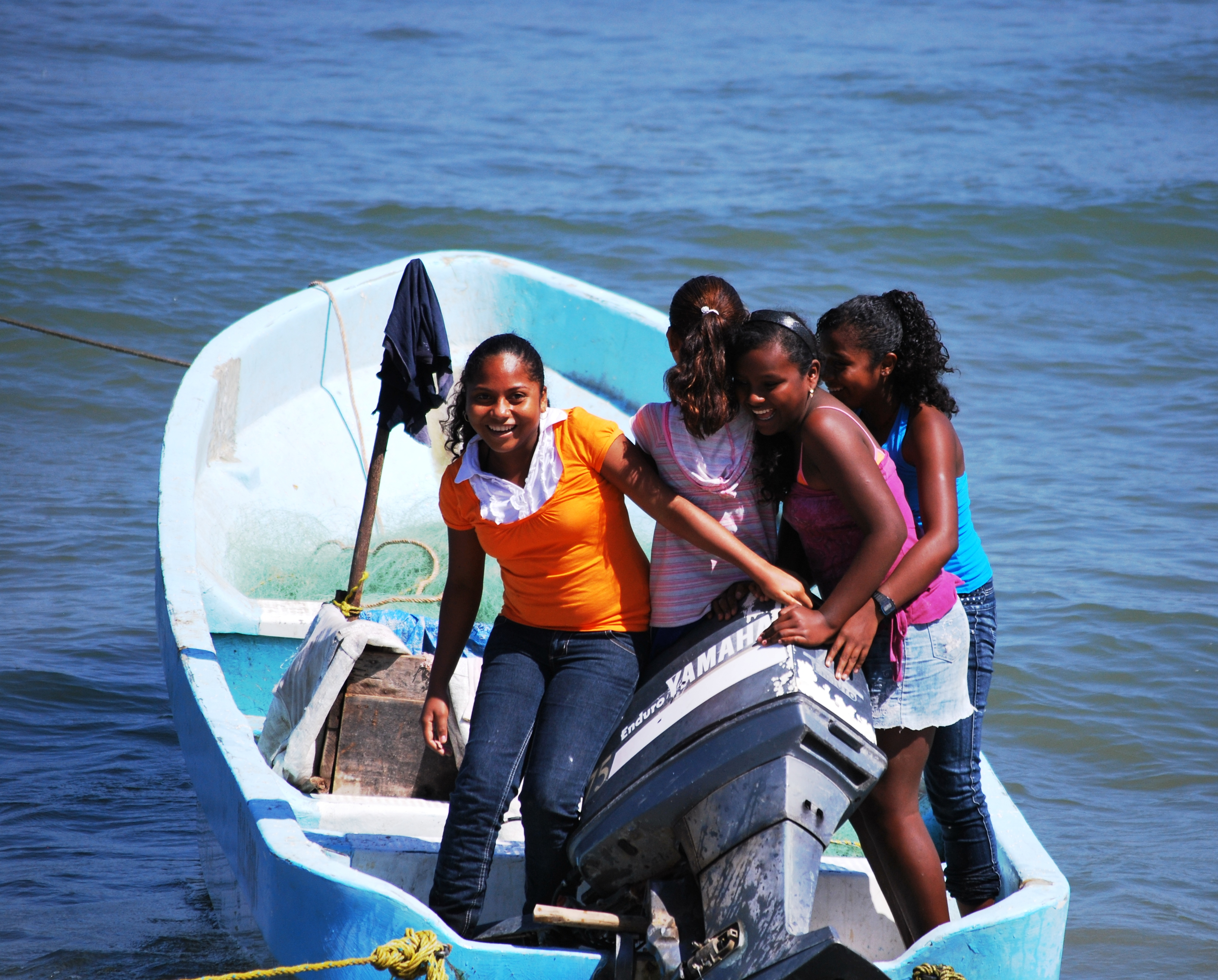
Afromestiza girls in Punta Maldonado, Cuajinicuilapa, Guerrero.

The Costa Chica ("small coast" in Spanish) extends from Acapulco to the town of Puerto Ángel in Oaxaca in Mexico's Pacific coast. The Costa Chica is not well known to travelers, with few attractions, especially where Afro-Mexicans live. Exceptions to this are the beaches of Marquelia and Punta Maldonado in Guerrero and the wildlife reserve in Chacahua, Oaxaca. The area was very isolated from the rest of Mexico, which prompted runaway slaves to find refuge here. However, this has changed to a large extent with the building of Fed 200 which connects the area to Acapulco and other cities on the Pacific coast. African identity and physical features are stronger here than elsewhere in Mexico as the slaves here did not intermarry to the extent that others did. Not only are black skin and African features more prominent, there are strong examples of African-based song, dance and other art forms. Until recently, homes in the area were round mud and thatch huts, the construction of which can be traced back to what are now the Ghana and Ivory Coast. Origin tales often center on slavery. Many relate to a shipwreck (often a slave ship) where the survivors settle here or that they are the descendants of slaves freed for fighting in the Mexican War of Independence. The region has a distinct African-influenced dance called the Danza de los Diablos (Dance of the Devils) which is performed for Day of the Dead. They dance in the streets with wild costumes and masks accompanied by rhythmic music. It is considered to be a syncretism of Mexican Catholic tradition and West African ritual. Traditionally the dance is accompanied by a West African instrument called a bote, but it is dying out as the younger generations have not learned how to play it.

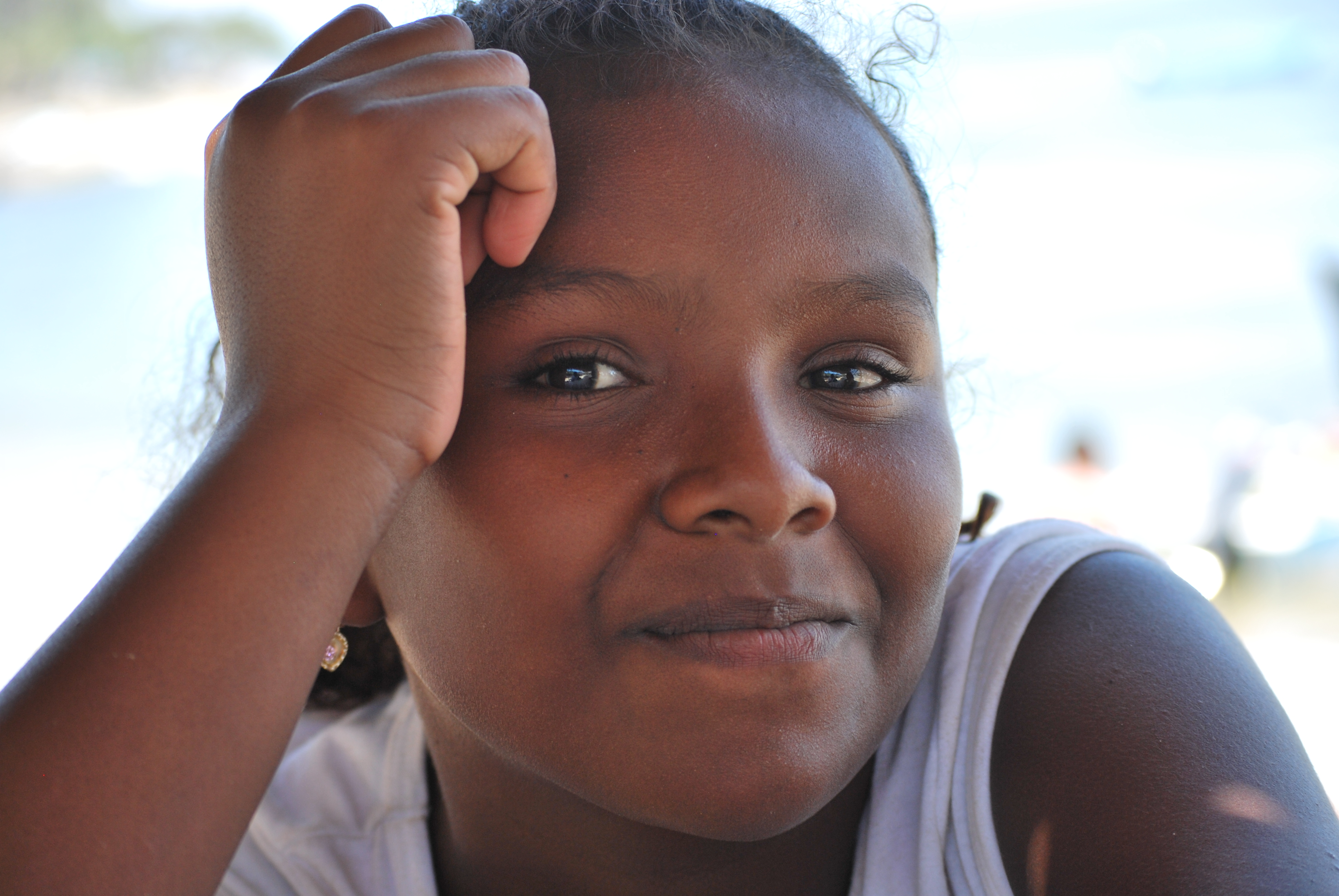
Girl from Punta Maldonado, Guerrero.

There are a number of "pueblos negros", or Black towns, in the region. Examples include Corralero and El Ciruelo in Oaxaca; the largest pueblos negros is Cuajinicuilapa in Guerrero. The latter is home to a museum called the Museo de las Culturas Afromestizos which documents the history and culture of the region.

The Afro-Mexicans here live among mestizos (Indigenous/white) and various Indigenous groups such as the Amuzgos, Mixtecs, Tlalpanecs and Chatinos. Terms used to denote them vary. White and mestizos in the Costa Chica call them "morenos" (meaning dark-skinned) and the Indigenous call them "negros" (meaning black). A survey done in the region determined that the Afro-Mexicans in this region themselves preferred the term "negro", although some prefer "moreno" and a number still use "mestizo". Relations between Afro-Mexican and Indigenous populations were strained as there was a long history of hostility, and while today there is no open hostility, negative stereotypes abound on both parts.

=== Afro-Mexican population in Veracruz ===
Like the Costa Chica, the state of Veracruz has a number of pueblos negros, notably the African named towns of Mandinga, Matamba, Mozambique, and Mozomboa as well as Chacalapa, Coyolillo, Yanga, and Tamiahua. The town of Mandinga, about forty five minutes south of Veracruz city, is particularly known for the restaurants that line its main street. Coyolillo hosts an annual Carnival with Afro-Caribbean dance and other African elements.

However, tribal and family group were separated and dispersed to a greater extent around the sugar cane growing areas in Veracruz. This had the effect of intermarriage and the loss or absorption of most elements of African culture in a few generations. This intermarriage means that while Veracruz remains "blackest" in Mexico's popular imagination, those with dark brown skin are mistaken for those from the Caribbean and/or not "truly Mexican". The total population of people of African Descent including people with one or more African ancestors is 4 percent, the third highest of any Mexican state.

The phenomena of runaways and slave rebellions began early in Veracruz with many escaping to the mountainous areas in the west of the state, near Orizaba and the Puebla border. Here groups of escaped slaves established defiant communities called palenques to resist Spanish authorities. The most important Palenque was established in 1570 by Gaspar Yanga and stood against the Spanish for about forty years until the Spanish were forced to recognize it as a free community in 1609, with the name of San Lorenzo de los Negros. It was renamed Yanga in 1932. Yanga was the first municipality of freed slaves in the Americas. However, the town proper has almost no people of obvious African heritage. Such people live in the smaller, more rural communities.

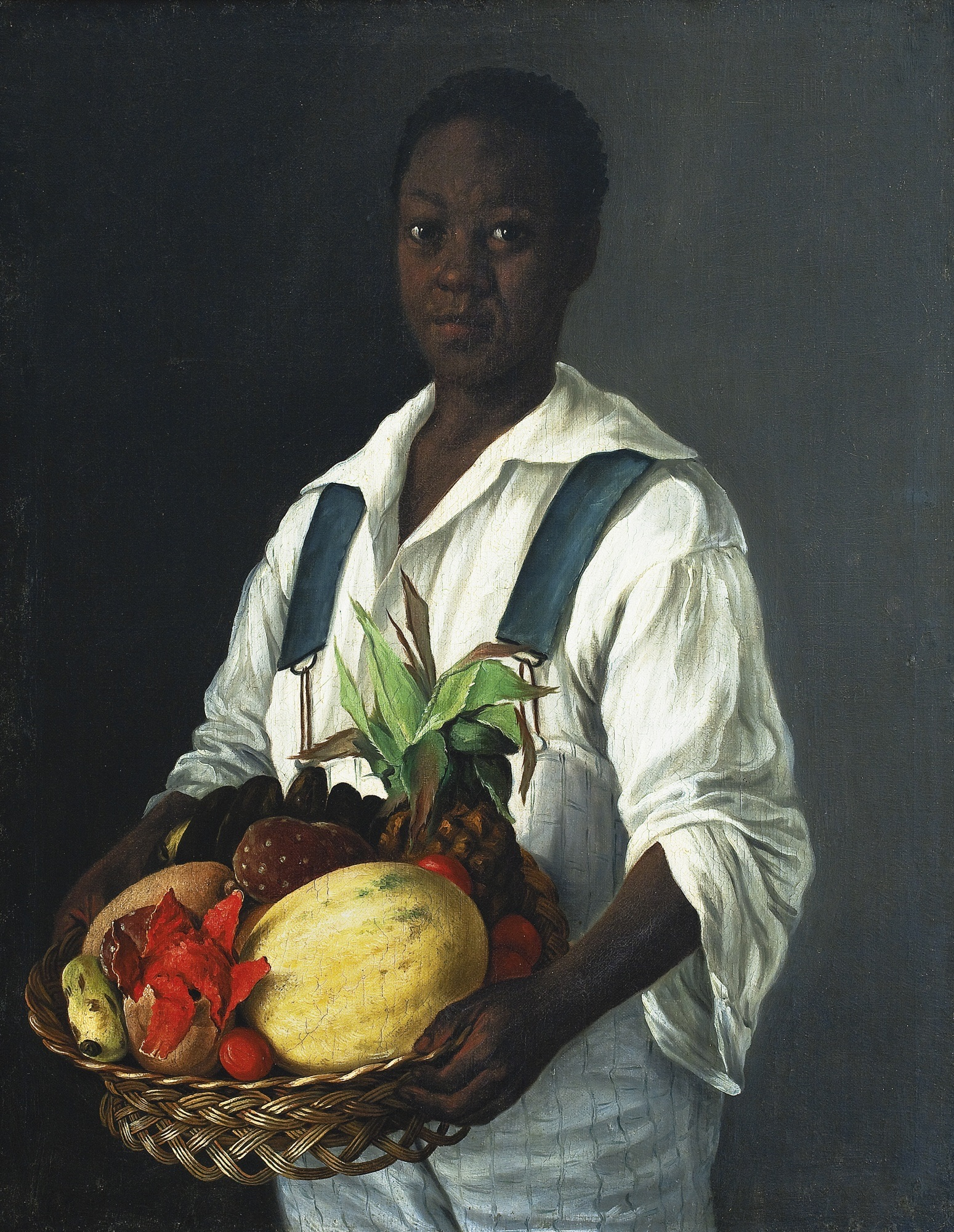
El Costeño by José Agustín Arrieta, the painting shows a boy from the coast, likely Veracruz, holding a basket of fruits including mamey, tuna and pitahaya.

Because African descendants dispersed widely into the general population, African and Afro-Cuban influence can be seen in Veracruz's music dance, improvised poetry, magical practices and especially food. Veracruz son music, known as son jarocho and best known through the popularity of the hit "La Bamba" shows a mixture of Andalusian, Canary Islander and African influence.

=== Afro-Mexican population in northern Mexico ===
Towns in north Mexico especially in Coahuila and along the country's border with Texas, also have Afro-Mexican populations and presence. Some enslaved and free Black Americans migrated into northern Mexico in the 19th century from the United States. A few of the routes of the Underground Railroad led to Mexico. One particular group was the Mascogos, a branch of Black Seminoles, originally from Florida, who escaped enslavement and free Black Americans intermingled with Seminole natives. Many of them settled in and around the town of El Nacimiento, Coahuila, where their descendants remain.

== Afro-Mexicans by state ==
State	% Afro-Mexicans	Afro-Mexican population	% Partial Afro-Mexicans	% Total Afro-descendants	Total Afro-descendant population
Mexico	2.04%	2,500,000	1.5%	2%	2,576,213
Aguascalientes	1.6%	656	0.35%	0.4%	5,250
Baja California	1.7%	7,294	0.31%	0.53%	17,573
Baja California Sur	3.33%	11,036	0.72%	2.27%	16,163
Campeche	2.1%	3,509	0.76%	1.15%	10,349
Coahuila	1.5%	2,659	0.28%	0.37%	10,933
Colima	1.9%	782	0.47%	0.58%	4,125
Chiapas	1.2%	4,174	0.33%	0.41%	24,309
Chihuahua	1.6%	2,845	0.25%	0.33%	11,734
Durango	0.9%	175	0.64%	0.65%	11,405
Guanajuato	1.8%	1,756	0.31%	0.34%	19,902
Guerrero	8%	229,661	1.11%	7.61%	268,880
Hidalgo	1.6%	2,000	0.54%	0.61%	17,435
Jalisco	1.7%	61,189	0.35%	1.13%	88,646
Estado de México	1.88%	304,327	0.45%	2.33%	377,171
Mexico City	2%	160,535	0.53%	2.33%	207,804
Michoacán	1.5%	3,667	0.51%	0.59%	27,048
Morelos	1.9%	7,996	0.49%	0.91%	17,324
Nayarit	0.6%	708	0.24%	0.30%	3,543
Nuevo Leon	1.7%	76,280	0.36%	1.85%	94,710
Oaxaca	4.95%	196,410	0.94%	5.89%	233,708
Puebla	1.7%	7,402	0.47%	0 .59%	36,396
Querétaro	1.8%	2,446	0.38%	0.50%	10,191
Quintana Roo	2.8%	8,408	0.71%	1.27%	19,069
San Luis Potosí	2%	1,087	0.51%	0.55%	14,948
Sinaloa	1.4%	1,186	0.24%	0.28%	8,305
Sonora	1.5%	1,710	0.30%	0.36%	10,261
Tabasco	1.6%	2,634	0.92%	1.03%	24,671
Tamaulipas	1.2%	9,980	0.36%	0.65%	22,371
Tlaxcala	1.3%	763	0.44%	0.50%	6,364
Veracruz	3.28%	266,090	0.79%	4.07%	330,178
Yucatán	3%	2,516	0.89%	1.01%	21,181
Zacatecas	1.1%	315	0.32%	0.34%	5,369
Source: INEGI (2020)

== Afro-Mexicans speak up ==
A new category was added recently to the census. An article by Pew Research Center focusing on different areas of Latin America utilized polls and concluded United States Latinos of Caribbean descent are more likely to identify as Afro-Latinos than others who have roots somewhere else. Mexico was going through changes because of its citizens' demands for a new category to include the Black population of the country. The added category brought attention to the way Mexico has been denying its ties to Africa. An article in The Guardian noted that Afro-Mexicans are being ignored by their own government due to their African roots. Latin America has experienced problems with colorism throughout its history into the present day, where darker individuals do not receive the same opportunities as those with lighter complexions. Colorism is deeply rooted in Mexico, as noted in an article titled "We exist. We're here': Afro-Mexicans make the census after long struggle for recognition" which says "classic discrimination due to skin colour. [They think] if you're black, you're not Mexican" this often leads to a bigger problem. Just because you have a darker complexion you are presented with more economic barriers than someone with a lighter complexion, you will not be able to obtain the same amount of resources because you will be pushed aside by the government.

In this article, they also mentioned that when Mexican President Andrés Manuel López Obrador went to visit the region of Costa Chica, he complained about the roads and the resources available to people who lived there. Now even though he had complained about this, he did completely nothing to change it. With this article, many are able to see the ways in which political figures notice the lack of economic opportunities in these places and the ways in which they are never changed. This brings attention to the lack of care or importance present in the country and is often reflected in areas where African roots are present.

== African influence on Mexican culture ==
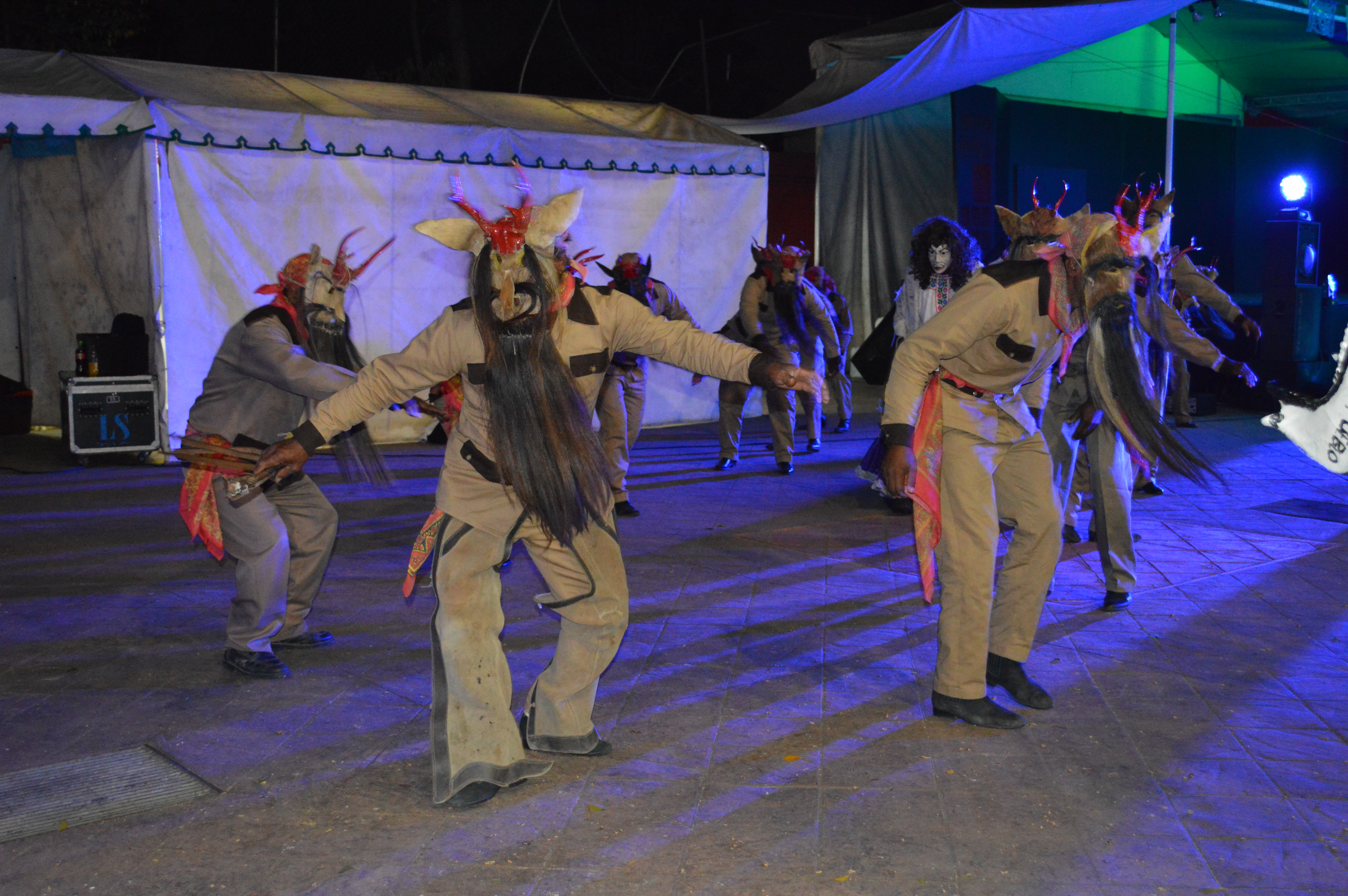
Performance of the Danza de los Diablos, a folk dance associated with the Afro-Mexican population of the Costa Chica.

=== Cuisine ===
==== Bananas and plantains ====
Both bananas and plantains originate from East Asia. However, by the time of European colonization, they were readily available on the African continent, where they would make their way to the New World. Bananas were reported in Mexico as early as the mid-1500s. The word banana itself derives from the Wolof word banana.

==== Okra ====
Although not common, okra is primarily consumed in the northern region of Mexico, where it is called ocra and the southern region of Mexico where it is called quimbombó. The word ocra and okra derive from the Igbo word okuru in reference to the same plant. The word quimbombó derives from the Kimbundu word Ki-ngombo.

==== Cowpeas ====
Cowpeas, the main variety of which being black-eyed peas are another uncommon crop of Mexico but in the state of Guanajuato where they are called Vericonas. Cowpeas originate and were domesticated in West Africa and made their way to the new world vis the Trans-Atlantic slave trade. By the 1500s, the state of Guanajuato was noted for its large African population where by 1580, roughly 800 slaves were reported working in a singular mine.

=== Arts ===
The first documented visually recording of the presence in what would be Mexico by Africans was in indigenous artist-scribes, while in these writings these figures would come secondary to the main narrative there is clear depictions of them as active individuals in their own agencies. As Mexican history progresses, African influences and visuals of Black bodies persist through erasure. Mexico's movement toward independence in 1810 notes ten percent of the population of being African descended. As Mexican independence prevails and Mexican racial and national identity found itself, a visual image of the Mexican identity is often created without Black individuals in mind. Mexican Muralism was one artistic movement that did create space for the Afro-descended. Muralist Fernando Leal was one artist who engaged with the prospects of race being discussed and the typical erasure of Afro-Mexicans. Artist Fermin Revueltas between 1922 and 1923 also painted a mural for discussion while depicting the Virgin Mary as Black.

=== Music ===
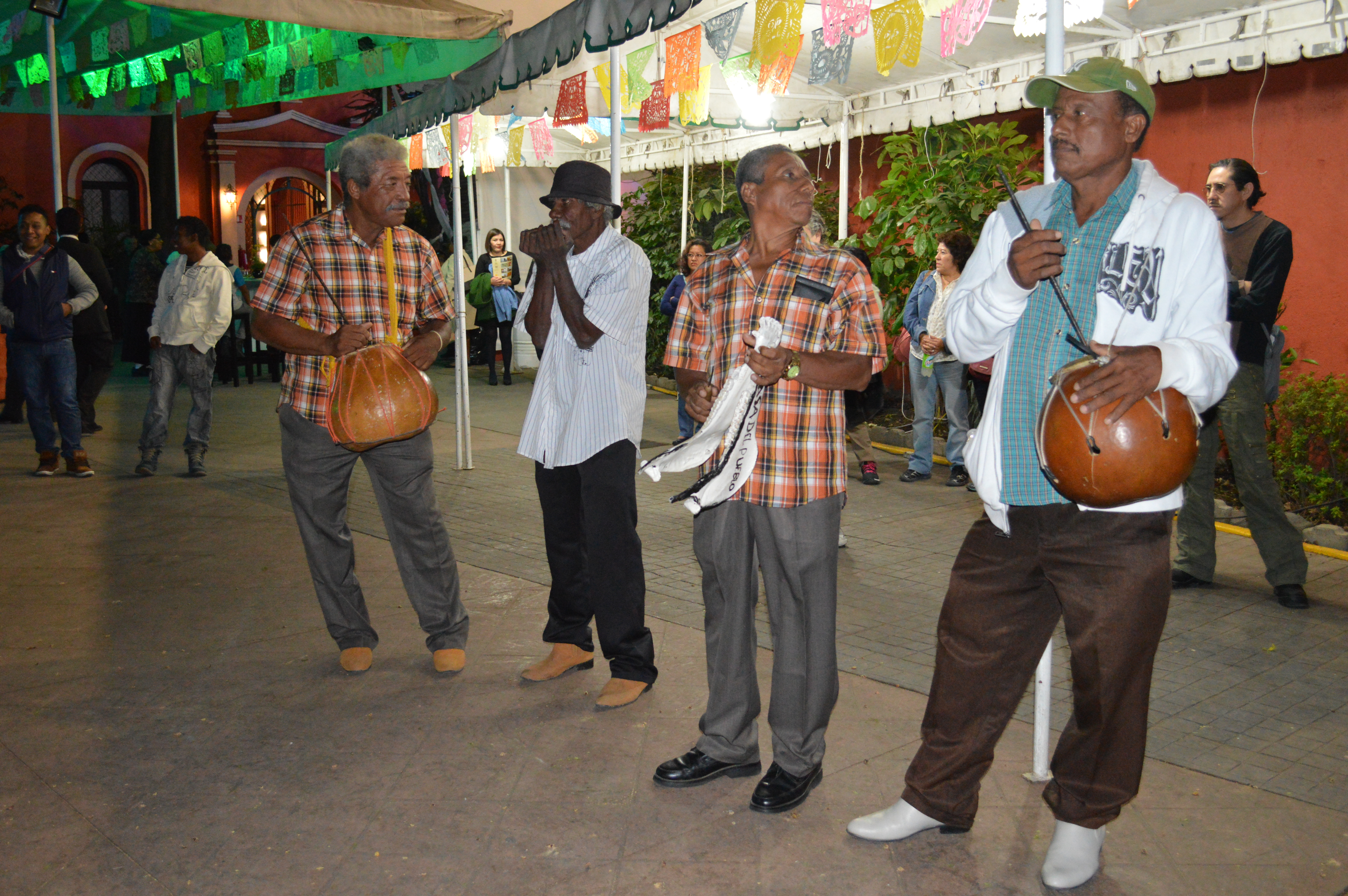
Musicians accompanying the Danza de los Diablos dancers. Among the instruments used are the quijada and bote

==== Son Jarocho ====
Son Jarocho is a regional folk musical style of Mexican Son from Veracruz, a Mexican state along the Gulf of Mexico. It is the fusion of Spanish and African musical elements, reflecting the population which evolved in the region from Spanish colonial times.

===== La Bamba =====
La Bamba is a classic example of the son jarocho musical style, which originated in the Mexican state of Veracruz and combines Spanish, indigenous, and African musical elements. The song is typically played on one or two arpas jarochas (harps) along with guitar relatives the jarana jarocha and the requinto jarocho. The word bamba is derived from Kimbundu mbamba meaning "master" as in someone who does something adeptly or skillfully.

==== Mexican Cumbia ====
Although its roots are in Colombia, Cumbia is a popular genre of music in Mexico. The word "cumbia" derives from West African vocabulary. Cumbia originates as the musical syncretism between instruments and traditions from the Afro-Colombian Palenques, Indigenous Colombian musical traditions as well as European influence. It is understood that cumbia first originated as a courtship dance and further developed to envelope expression and resistance during the Trans Atlantic cultural exchange.

=== Vocabulary ===
A list of a handful of calques of African origin are as follows:

- The word macondo meaning banana, comes from the Kikongo word of the same meaning.
- Mandinga, in reference to the devil comes from Kimbundu ndinga meaning "cruel"
- Macuma, from Kikongo makamba meaning "to help"
- Conga from Kimbundu nkonga meaning "music"
- Marimba from Kikongo madimba in reference to the same instrument
- Cumbia from West African word "cumbe"

== Notable Afro-Mexicans ==
The majority of the 2.04% of the total Mexican population that identifies as Afro-Mexican are native Afromestizos, i.e. "mixed-race". Individuals of exclusively Black ancestry are a small minority in the Afro-Mexican population, being recent immigrants or their Mexican-born children. The following list is of notable Afro-Mexicans, a noteworthy portion of which are the descendants of recent Black immigrants to Mexico from Africa, the Caribbean, and elsewhere in the Americas. Mexico employs jus soli when granting citizenship, meaning that any individual born on Mexican territory will be granted citizenship regardless of his or her parents' immigration status.

=== Colonial-era figures ===
- Juan Garrido (1487–1550) – Spanish Black conquistador of Mexico of Congolese origin.
- Juan Valiente (1505–1553) – Spanish Black conquistador and resident of Puebla.
- Juan Roque (died 1623) – wealthy and prominent Afro-Mexican of New Spain known for his will and testament
- Gaspar Yanga (born 1545) – founder of the first free African township in the Americas, in 1609

=== Politics ===
- Vicente Guerrero (1782–1831) – Mexican President and abolitionist
- Joaquín Hendricks Díaz (born 1951) – former governor of Quintana Roo
- Fidel Herrera (1949-2025) – former governor of Veracruz
- René Juárez Cisneros (1956–2021) – governor of Guerrero
- Pío Pico (1801–1894) – last Mexican governor of Alta California

=== Entertainment ===
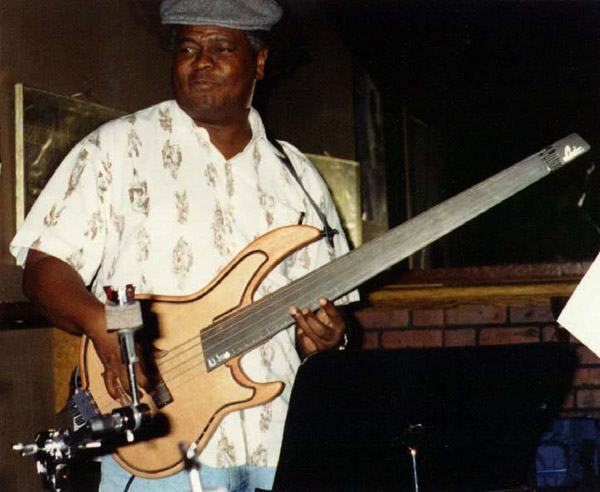
Mexican bassist Abraham Laboriel is of Honduran Garifuna descent

- Álvaro Carrillo – composer, songwriter
- Kid Cudi – American rapper (partially Mexican American father)
- Jean Duverger – dancer, singer, and sportscaster of French Haitian descent
- Abraham Laboriel, Sr. – musician of Honduran Garifuna origin; one of the most recorded bass guitarists in popular music
- Johnny Laboriel – 1950s and '60s rock and roll singer of Honduran Garifuna origin and member of Los Rebeldes Del Rock
- Kalimba Marichal – Mexican singer and actor born to Afro-Cuban parents
- Kiana Ledé – singer (Mexican American mother)
- Toña la Negra – singer of partial Haitian origin
- Miguel – American rapper (Mexican father)
- Lupita Nyong'o – actress (Kenyan parents)
- Alejandra Robles – singer and dancer from the Costa Chica of Oaxaca with Afro-Mexican descent via her paternal grandfather
- Kirko Bangz – American rapper (partially Mexican American mother)
- Jacob Perez – member of boy band Mindless Behavior
- Adrián Makala – actor
- Kid Ink – American rapper from Los Angeles, California

=== Visual arts ===
- Elizabeth Catlett – African American artist (naturalized Mexican)
- Juan Correa – 17th-century Mexican painter who was the son of a dark-skinned (possibly Mulato) Spaniard from Cadiz and an Afro-Mexican woman
- Julia López – painter from the Costa Chica of Guerrero, born to parents of African and Amuzgo backgrounds. Her works primarily include the depictions of dark-skinned figures within tropical environments nostalgically inspired by her youth and the people who surrounded her
- Leonel Maciel – artist of mixed African, Asian and indigenous roots

=== Sports ===
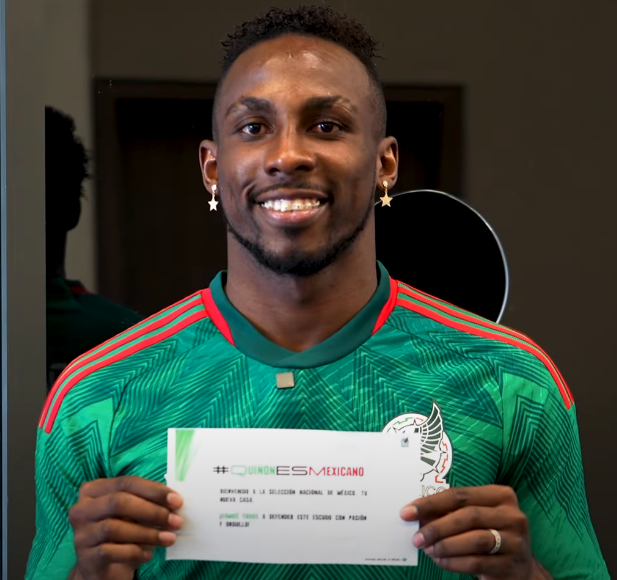
Julián Quiñones is a Colombian-born footballer who became a naturalized Mexican citizen.

- Javier Arenas – american football player
- Mark Aguirre – basketball player
- Randy Arozarena – baseball player (Afro-Cuban defector, naturalized Mexican citizen)
- Prisca Awiti Alcaraz – judoka (Kenyan father)
- Chris Roberson – baseball player (African American, naturalized Mexican citizen)
- Devin Booker – basketball player (Mexican mother)
- Melvin Brown – footballer (Afro-Jamaican paternal grandfather)
- Héctor Camacho Jr. – boxer (Mexican American mother)
- Adrián Chávez – footballer (African American father)
- Michael Davis – american football player (Mexican mother)
- Arian Foster – American football player (Mexican American mother)
- Ozziel Herrera – footballer (Afro-Cuban father)
- Ziggy Hood – american football player
- Edoardo Isella – footballer (Afro-Honduran father)
- Joao Maleck – footballer (Cameroonian father)
- Roberto Nurse – footballer (Afro-Panamanian father)
- Richard Okunorobo – footballer (Nigerian father)
- Jorge Orta – former baseball player
- Julián Quiñones – footballer (Afro-Colombian, naturalized Mexican citizen)
- James de la Rosa – boxer
- Juan de la Rosa – boxer
- Giovani dos Santos – footballer (Afro-Brazilian father)
- Jonathan dos Santos – footballer (Afro-Brazilian father)
- Juan Toscano-Anderson – basketball player (African American father)
- Taijuan Walker – baseball player (Mexican American mother)
- Jonathan Jones (baseball) – baseball player (African American father)
- Khris Davis – baseball player (African American father)
- Nick Williams (baseball) – (African American father)
- Earl Watson – basketball player (African American father)
- Fred Warner (American football) – American football player (partially Mexican American mother)
- Black Warrior – wrestler
- Bryce Young – american football player
- El Hijo del Fantasma – wrestler
- Rubén Amaro Sr. – former baseball player
- Isaías Violante - footballer
- Da'vian Kimbrough - footballer (African American father)
- Sergio Lira (footballer) - footballer
- Matheus Reis (footballer, born 2007) - footballer (Afro Brazilian father)
- William Lodmell - footballer (Senegalese mother)

=== Fictional figures ===
The comic character Memín Pinguín, whose magazine has been available in Latin America, the Philippines, and the United States newsstands for more than 60 years, is a Mexican of Afro-Cuban descent. The Mexican government issued a series of five stamps in 2005 honoring the Memín comic-book series. The character has been praised by the Mexican audience, who remember growing up with the magazine, but has also been criticized for employing racial stereotypes.

== Gallery ==
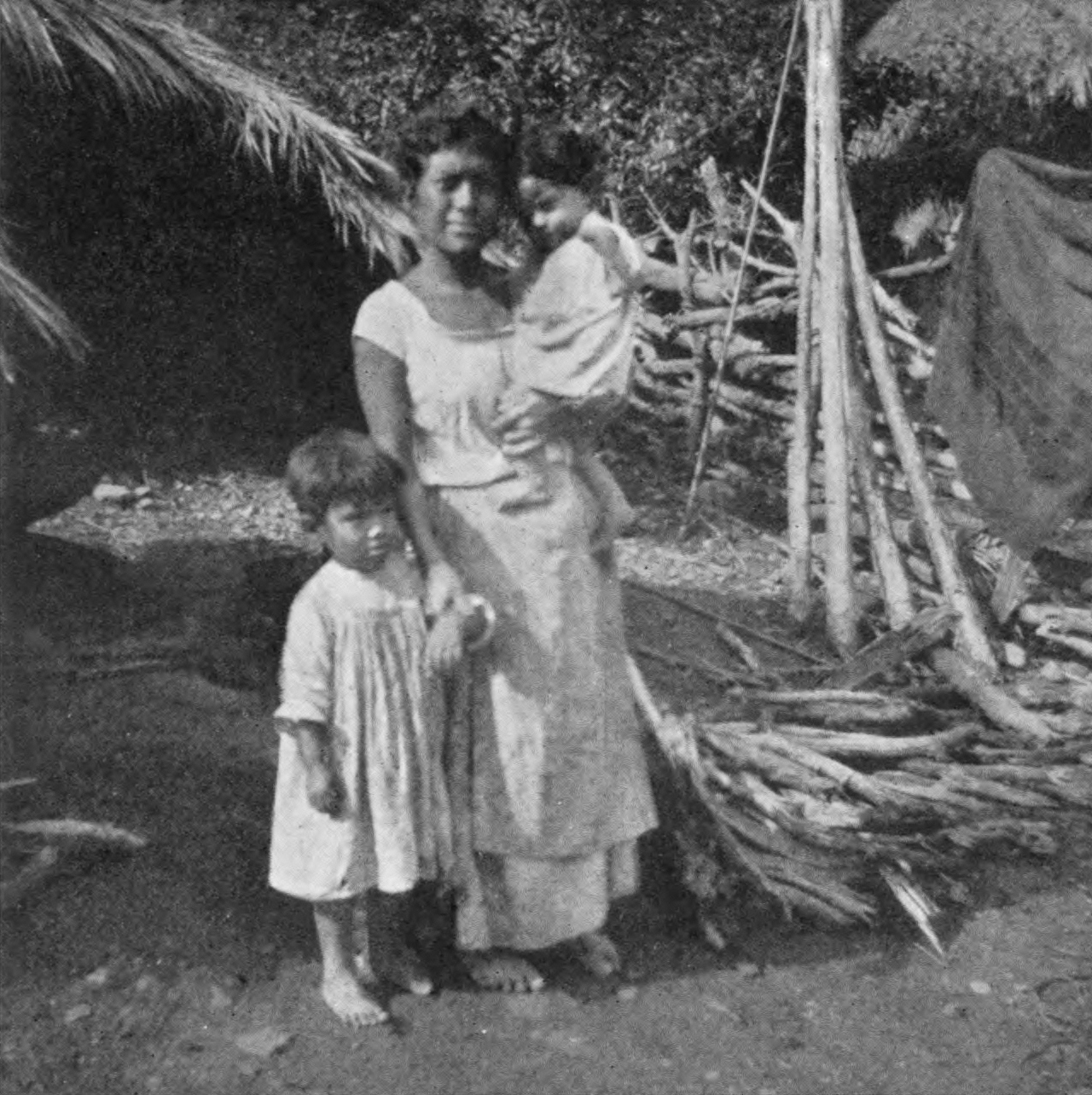
Zamba of Mesquititlan, a picture from the 1908 book Through Southern Mexico by Hans Gadow

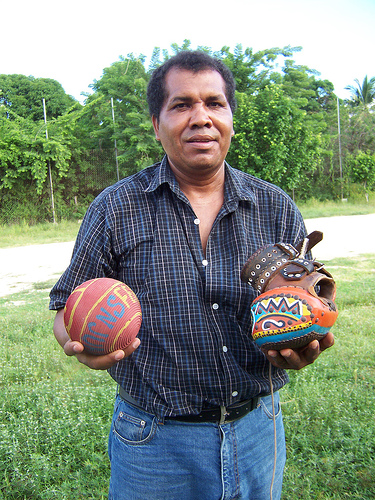
An Afromestizo from the coast of Oaxaca holding a Pelota mixteca.

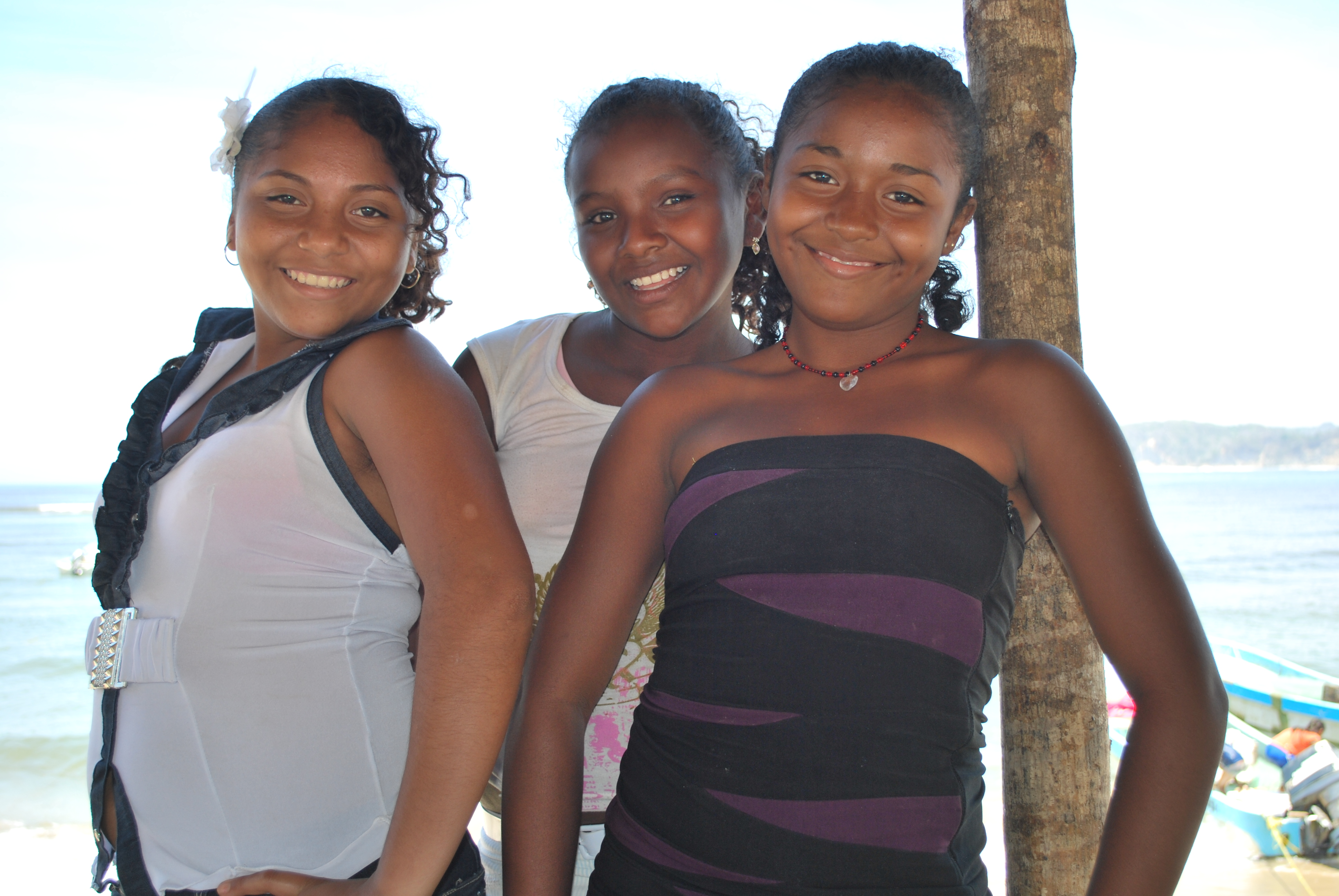
Girls in Punta Maldonado, Cuajinicuilapa, Guerrero.

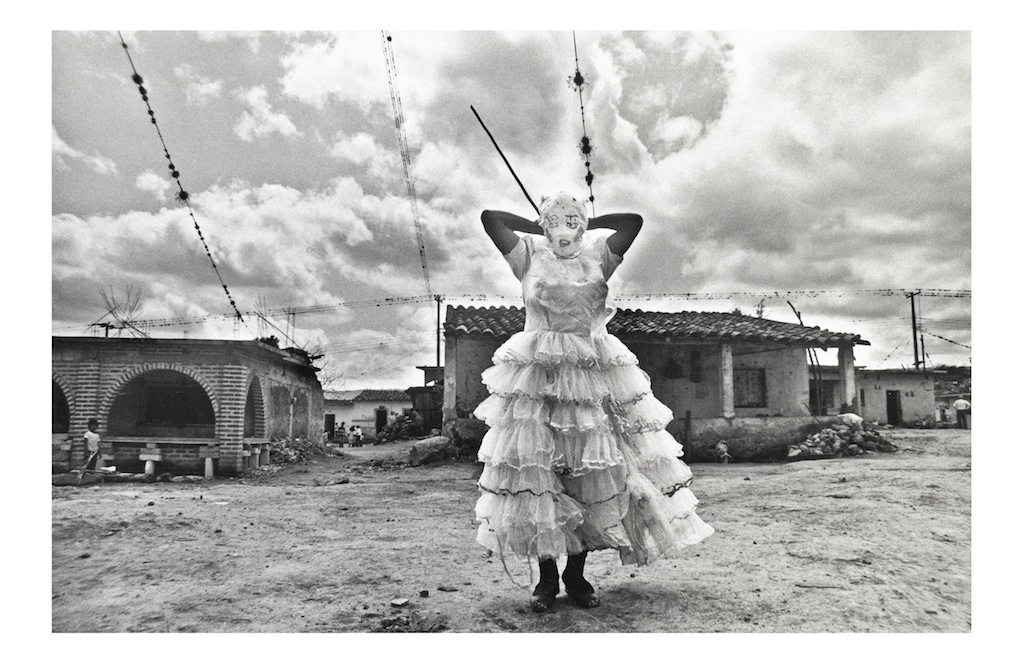
Woman getting ready for the Carnival in Coyolillo, Actopan, Veracruz.

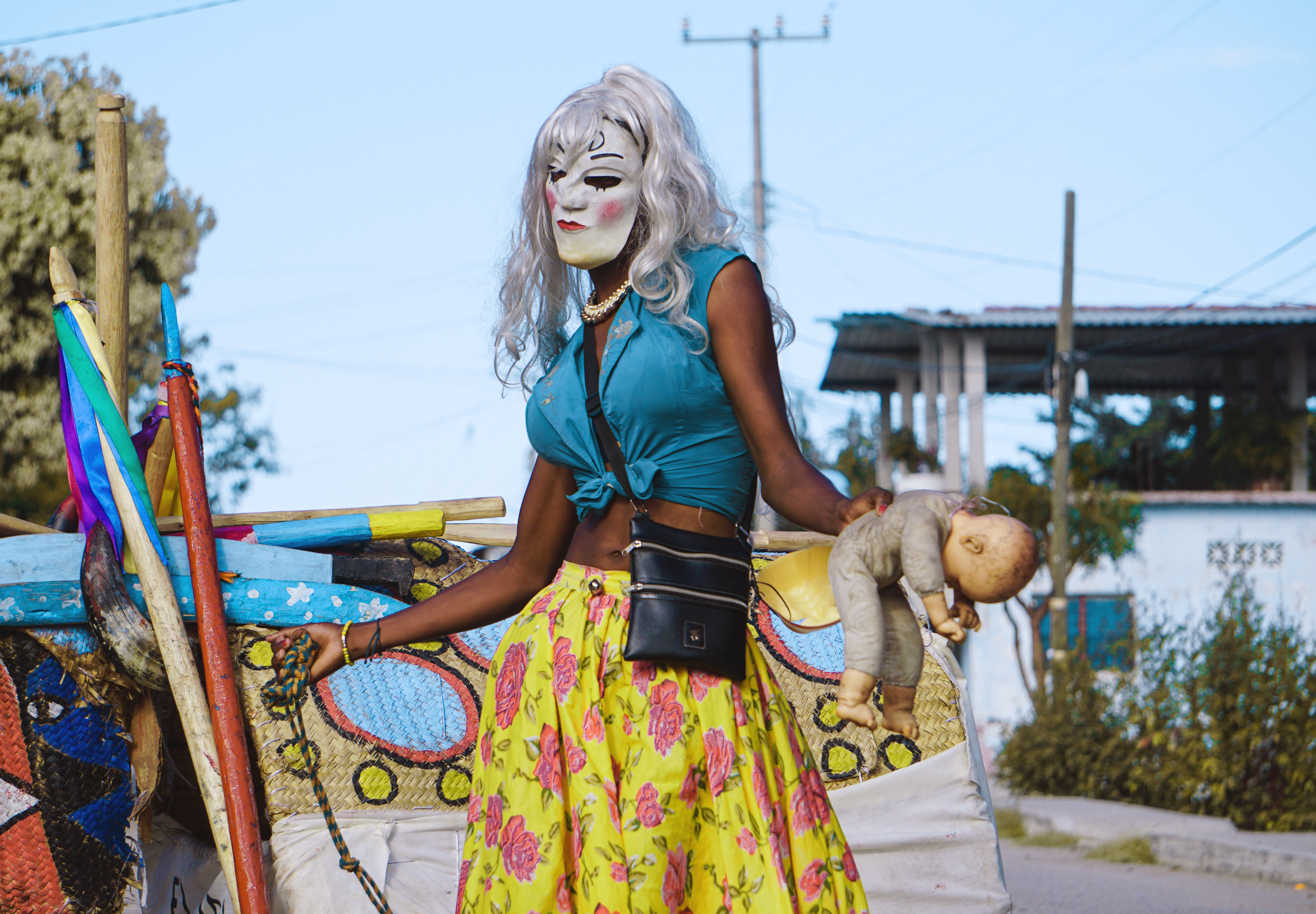
La Minga, a satirical character in the dances of the Costa Chica

== See also ==
- Afro-Latin Americans
- Afro-Mexicans in the Mexican War of Independence
- Black Hispanic and Latino Americans
- Black Indians in the United States
- Blaxican
- Indigenous Mexican Americans
- Indigenous peoples of Mexico
- White Mexicans
- Asian Mexicans
- Indigenous peoples of the Americas
- Slavery in colonial Spanish America
- Atlantic slave trade
