= Edoardo Isella =

Mexican footballer (born 1980)

Personal information
- Full name: Edoardo Isella D´Gómez Ventoza
- Date of birth: 9 October 1980 (age 46)
- Place of birth: Tuxtla Gutiérrez, Chiapas, Mexico
- Height: 1.83 m (6 ft 0 in)
- Position: Defender

Youth career
- Guadalajara

Senior career*
Years	Team	Apps	(Gls)
2000–2001	Guadalajara	21	(0)
2001–2002	Tigres UANL	4	(0)
2002–2003	Cruz Azul	1	(0)
2004	Jaguares	47	(0)
2004–2007	América	3	(0)
2007–2008	León	14	(2)
2008–2009	Correcaminos UAT		
2009–2012	Halcones	73	(6)
2012–2014	Municipal	68	(3)

International career
2001	Mexico	1	(0)
- * Club domestic league appearances and goals

Edoardo Isella D'Gómez Ventoza (born 9 October 1980), known as Edoardo Isella, is a Mexican former professional footballer who played as a defender. He is known as one of the first Afro-Mexicans to debut for Guadalajara.

== Early life ==
Isella was born in Tuxtla Gutiérrez, Chiapas to an Afro-Honduran father and a Mexican mother.

== International career ==
Isella was eligible to play for Mexico or Honduras at international level. He opted to represent the former after joining the youth academy of Mexican club Guadalajara. He managed to get an early call-up to the Mexico national football team by coach Enrique Meza after having a standout 2000–01 season with the Guadalajara first team.

== See also ==
- Afro-Mexicans
