= Juan Roque (Zape Confraternity) =

One of the wealthiest known African residents of colonial Latin America

Juan Roque was an African resident of colonial Mexico City. He died in 1623, leaving behind one of very few surviving wills and testaments of African residents of colonial Latin America. His daughter Ana María, and the confraternity to which he belonged in the hospital of the Limpia Concepción, also left behind documents describing a court battle which detail the final requests made by Juan Roque concerning a house "in the neighborhood of San Hipólito in the lane next to the College of San Juan where it meets the open air market of San Hipólito, bordering the houses of the marshals and those of Don Ángel de Villasaña".

== Africans in New Spain ==
Africans played a notable role in the Spanish Conquest. Spanish and Portuguese conquistadores kidnapped African people to enslave them to control their work force and life, giving the start of the Atlantic Slave Trade. As colonial Latin America and Caribbean spread, African and African descent people were associated with slavery. However, this stereotypical representation was not always the case. There are several examples of Africans and mulattos who played active roles in the early 16th century. Some of them were historical figures as Juan Garrido, Juan García, and Juan Valiente. The little known history of Juan Roque is a positive reference of building a generational wealth.

By the 17th century, Africans lived in colonial Latin America, with distinctive organizations and communities that blended African culture with the laws and social expectations of the Spaniards. In New Spain, Africans from modern-day coastal Sierra Leone founded a brotherhood in Mexico City, which became the Zape confraternity. Documents describe how Africans rose from slavery to become influential members of the community.

=== Wealth and status of Juan Roque ===
Brought to New Spain as a slave before 1600, Juan Roque left a comprehensive will and testament at his death. It reveals the importance of 'confraternities' to the African community in Mexico City, as well as the prominence some Africans were able to achieve. Written before his death in 1623, this last will and testament provided for a lavish and expensive funeral and lists profitable real estate that helped ensure the survival of the Zape confraternity in Mexico City for several decades after his death. Both expensive and Catholic, Juan Roque's funeral provides evidence that Africans could establish themselves within communities in colonial Latin America. He requested that he be buried either in the church of the Hospital of Our Lady of Immaculate Conception or the Santísma Veracruz Church, of which he was a parishioner. In addition, Juan Roque asked that the brotherhoods to which he belonged, like the Zape confraternity, accompany his body to the burial and that fifty-five Masses be sung for his soul at different churches around Mexico City, as well as twenty Masses sung for his deceased wife, Isabel de Herrera.

In her essay analyzing confraternities in New Spain, Nicole von Germeten points out that as a prominent and wealthy African in Mexico City, Juan Roque's lavish funeral "with all the trappings of baroque religiosity" and membership in a confraternity like that of the Zape nation demonstrates the respectability of men of African descent in colonial Latin America. Roque stated that his deceased wife was a free black woman, and when bequeathing his profitable real estate in the neighborhood of San Hipólito, Juan Roque pointed to the status of his daughter, Ana María, as a legitimate daughter from his marriage "according to the Most Holy Church" to Isabel de Herrera and therefore a free black woman. Designating these Africans as free, gave them status within the community and helped the Zape confraternity, as it made its case to regain the income from houses around San Hipólito, following Ana María dying childless.

== Confraternities ==
Before her death, Ana María spoke to members of the Zape Confraternity confirming that her father had wished the brotherhood to receive the income from the real estate in San Hipólito.

In colonial Latin America, confraternities were organizations that allowed Africans to achieve a sense of community after being taken from their homeland through the slave trade. These brotherhoods also facilitated the Africans' conversion to Catholicism: by providing a place of worship, a Christian community, and financial support for members' funerals. The confraternities provided social welfare for Africans in New Spain and limited health care, when Africans were denied access to other assistance.

The importance of the confraternity's ability to aid its members monetarily, is clearly evident in the court documents detailing the Zape Confraternity's battle to receive the income of Juan Roque's houses in San Hipólito. Juan Roque's exact description of the location of the houses in his last will and testament attempted to ensure that his daughter, and eventually the confraternity, would receive the benefits of the properties.

Several witnesses said that Ana María was adamant that her father wished the houses to go to the brotherhood, should she die without children. Even when one of the elder members of the confraternity urged her to agree with her husband and sell the houses, Ana María refused, because her father "charged her that if she did not have children she should not dispose of the houses, but give them the Brotherhood of the Immaculate Conception (the Zape Confraternity), of which he was a member and founder, so that the blacks of the Zape nation would administer them and take care of their earnings".
