= Afro–Latin Americans =

Latin Americans with Sub-Saharan African ancestry

Afro-Latin Americans
Afro-latino-américains (French) Afro-amerik-latino (Haitian Creole) Afrolatinoamericanos (Spanish) Afro-latino-americanos (Portuguese)

Total population
- 48,340,000

Regions with significant populations
- Brazil: 20,656,458
- Haiti: 10,896,000
- Colombia: 4,944,400
- Mexico: 2,576,213
- Dominican Republic: 1,704,000
- Panama: 1,258,915
- United States: 1,163,862
- Cuba: 1,034,044
- Venezuela: 936,770
- Peru: 828,824
- Ecuador: 814,468
- Nicaragua: 572,000
- Uruguay: 255,074
- Puerto Rico: 228,711
- Honduras: 191,000
- Argentina: 149,493
- Costa Rica: 57,000
- Guatemala: 35,000
- Bolivia: 25,168
- Chile: 9,919
- Paraguay: 8,013
- El Salvador: 7,441

Languages
- Spanish, Portuguese, French, Antillean Creole French, English, and several creoles

Religion
- Christianity (mainly Roman Catholicism, with minority Protestantism), Afro-American religions, or others

Related ethnic groups
- Africans, Afro-American peoples of the Americas, Afro-Caribbeans, Black Latino Americans, Garifuna

Afro–Latin Americans (French: Afro-latino-américains; Haitian Creole: Afro-amerik-Latino; Spanish: Afrolatinoamericanos; Portuguese: Afro-latino-americanos), also known as Black Latin Americans (French: Latino-américains noirs; Haitian Creole: Nwa Ameriken Latin; Spanish: Latinoamericanos negros; Portuguese: Negros latino-americanos), (Note: The terms Afro-Latines and Afro-Latinx have also been introduced as gender neutral alternatives. See also Latinx.) are Latin Americans of significant sub-Saharan African ancestry. Genetic studies suggest most Latin American populations have at least some level of African admixture.

The term Afro-Latin American is not widely used in Latin America outside academic circles. Normally Afro–Latin Americans are called Black (Spanish: negro or moreno; Portuguese: negro or preto; French: noir or nègre; Haitian Creole: nwa or nègès). Latin Americans of African ancestry may also be grouped by their specific nationality, such as Afro-Brazilian, Afro-Cuban, Afro-Haitian, or Afro-Mexican.

The number of Afro–Latin Americans may be underreported in official statistics, especially when derived from self-reported census data, because of negative attitudes to African ancestry in some countries. Afro-Latinos are part of the wider African diaspora.

== History ==
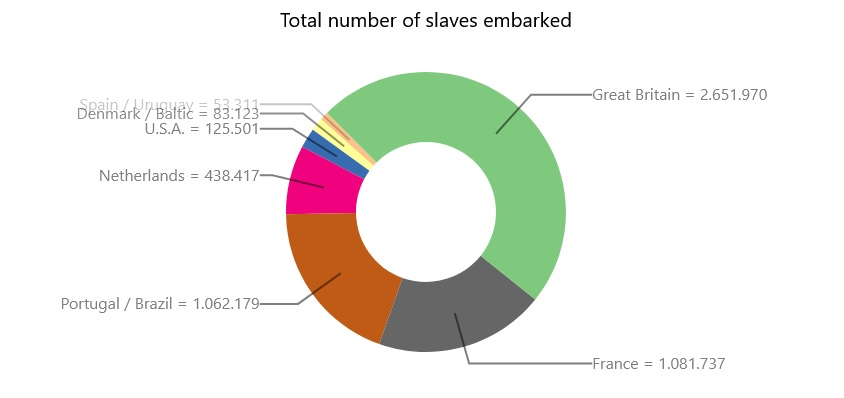
Slaves embarked to America from 1450 until 1800 by country

In the 15th and 16th centuries, many people of African origin were brought to the Americas by the English, Portuguese, Dutch, French and Spanish primarily as enslaved people, while some Spanish arrived as part of exploratory groups. A notable example of the latter was the black conquistador Juan Garrido, who introduced wheat to Mexico. Pedro Alonso Niño, traditionally considered the first of many New World explorers of African descent, was a navigator in the 1492 Columbus expedition. Those transported as part of the Atlantic slave trade were usually from West Africa, and were forced to work as agricultural, domestic, and menial laborers, and as mineworkers. They also worked in mapping and exploration (for example, Estevanico) and were even involved in conquest (for example, Juan Valiente) or in the army (for example, Francisco Menendez). These enslaved people largely belonged to ethnic groups such as the Gbe, Yoruba, Mande, Bakongo, Mbundu, and Wolof, among others.

Enslaved Africans brought to Latin America were obtained from inter-ethnic & inter-religious conflict throughout West and Central Africa.

Such inter-ethnic conflicts include the wars between the Oyo Empire and the Kingdom of Dahomey, in the 18th and 19th centuries, in which Dahomey enslaved and sold a large number of Yoruba people into slavery in the New World.

The Mbundu of the Ndongo Kingdom (in modern-day Angola) were enslaved in large numbers in the 16th and 17th centuries, due to their conflict with the Kingdom of Kongo and Portuguese Angola.

The Fulani Jihads caused conflict between the highly Islamized Fulani people and ethnic groups that adhered to traditional West African religion. These ethnic groups include the Temne, Yoruba, Chamba, Bamileke, Fang, and Tikar peoples. This led to inter-religious clashes in which captives from both sides were traded to Europeans.

Furthermore, some enslaved people were obtained from civil and internal conflicts. Such an example include the succession disputes in the Kingdom of Kongo, which caused to frequent civil wars and led many Bakongo people to be sold as slaves by rival factions throughout the 17th, 18th, and 19th centuries.

The Hispanic model of identity and representation has been historically characterized by its multi-faceted nature, which transcends strict racial categorizations. Numerous figures exemplify this complexity, including Martín de Porres, Beatriz de Palacios, Spanish conquistador Juan Garrido that established the first commercial wheat farm in the Americas, Estevanico, Francisco Menendez, Juan de Villanueva, Juan Valiente, Juan Beltrán de Magaña, Pedro Fulupo, Juan Bardales, Antonio Pérez, Gómez de León, Leonor Galiano, Teresa Juliana de Santo Domingo and Juan García. Additionally, Juan Latino stands out as a significant figure in this discourse; he is recognized as the first black African to attend a European university, ultimately achieving the status of professor. This highlights the notion that the Hispanic identity is not monolithic and is instead enriched by diverse contributions across racial and ethnic lines. Such examples serve to challenge simplistic perceptions of race within the historical narrative of Hispanic culture.

The Caribbean and South America received 95 percent of the Africans arriving in the Americas with only five percent going to Northern America.

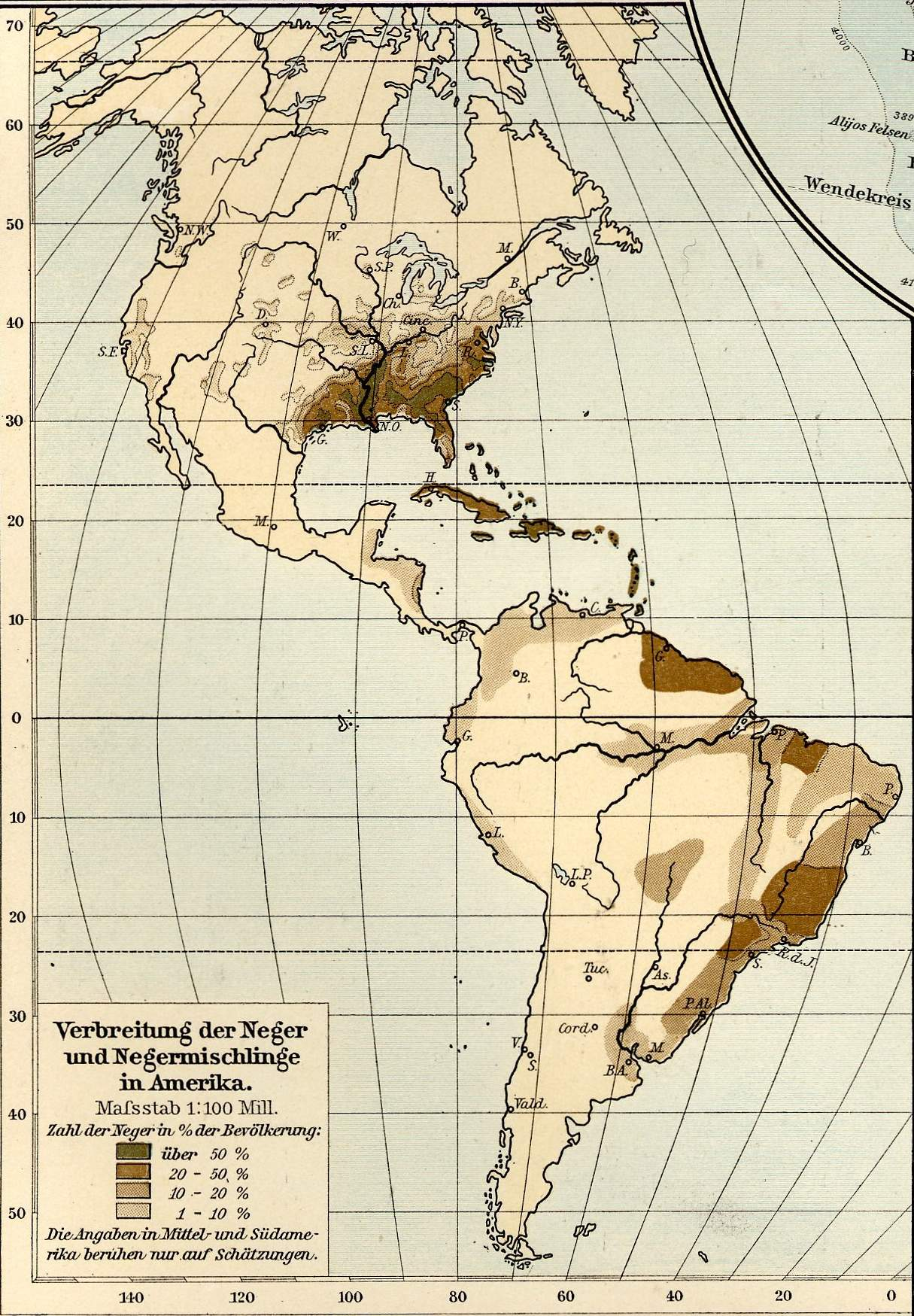
Map of the Black African population in the Americas (1901)

Traditional terms for Afro–Latin Americans with their own developed culture include Garífuna (in Nicaragua, Honduras, Guatemala, and Belize), cafuzo (in Brazil) and zambo in the Andes and Central America. Marabou is a term of Haitian origin denoting a Haitian of multiracial ethnicity.

The mix of these African cultures with the Spanish, Portuguese, French, and indigenous cultures of Latin America has produced many unique forms of language (e.g., Palenquero, Garífuna, and Creole), religions (e.g., Candomblé, Santería, and Vodou), music (e.g., kompa, salsa, Bachata, Punta, Palo de Mayo, plena, samba, merengue, and cumbia), martial arts (capoeira) and dance (rumba and merengue).

As of 2015, Mexico and Chile are the only two Latin American countries yet to formally recognize their Afro-Latin American population in their constitutions. This is in contrast to countries like Brazil and Colombia that lay out the constitutional rights of their African-descendant population.

In May 2022, the Project on Ethnicity and Race in Latin America (PERLA) at Princeton University estimated that about 130 million people in Latin America are of African descent.

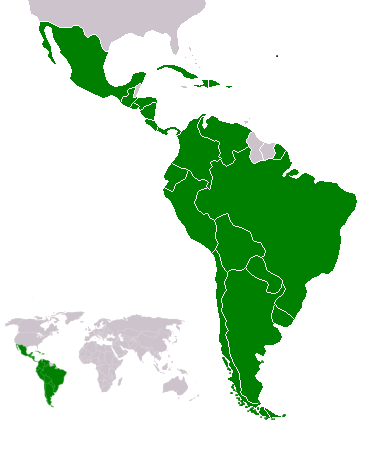
Map of Latin America

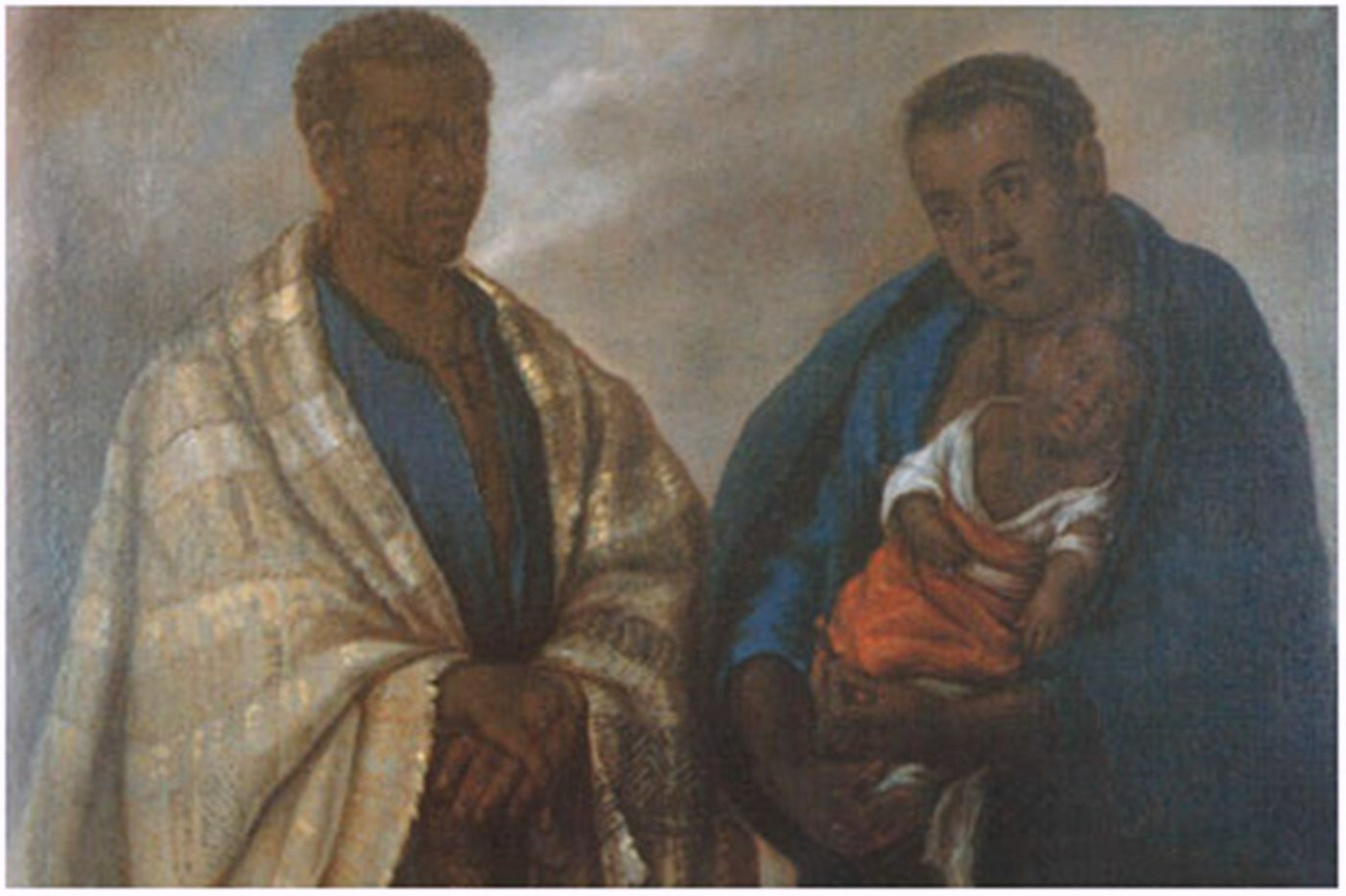
18th-century painting showing a family of free blacks

== Racial and ethnic distinctions ==
Terms used to refer to African heritage within Latin America include mulato (African–white mixture), zambo/chino (indigenous–African mixture) and pardo (African–native–white mixture) and mestizo, which refers to an indigenous–European mixture in all cases except for in Venezuela, where it is used in place of "pardo". The term mestizaje refers to the intermixing or fusing of ethnicities, whether by custom or deliberate policy. In Latin America this happened extensively between multiple ethnic groups and cultures, but usually involved European men and Indigenous or African women. Within Spanish-speaking Latin America specifically, the Hispanidad model of identity has historically assumed some degree of mestizaje but emphasizes Hispanic ethnic identity over racial categorizations.

== Representation in the media ==
Afro–Latin Americans have limited media appearance; critics have accused the Latin American media of overlooking the African, indigenous and multiracial populations in favor of over-representation of often blond and blue/green-eyed white Latin Americans. According to May 2022 Pew Research survey, Afro-Latinos in the United States were about 3 times more likely than other Latino adults to report being unfairly stopped by police. About half of the Afro-Latinos interviewed were told to go back to their country, and a third of them were called offensive names.

== South America ==
=== Argentina ===
According to the Argentina national census of the year 2022, the total Argentine population is 46,234,830, from which 302,936 were of African ancestry. Traditionally it has been argued that the black population in Argentina declined since the early 19th century into insignificance. Many believe that the black population declined due to systematic efforts to reduce the black population in Argentina in order to mirror the racially homogeneous countries of Europe. A 2005 study found that 5% of the population had African ancestry, while a more recent study suggested 9% may have African heritage. Researchers such as Alí Delgado and Patricia Gomes have suggested that, rather than Black people disappearing, erasure from the 19th century onward has resulted in the "invisibility" of African culture and roots in Argentina.

=== Bolivia ===
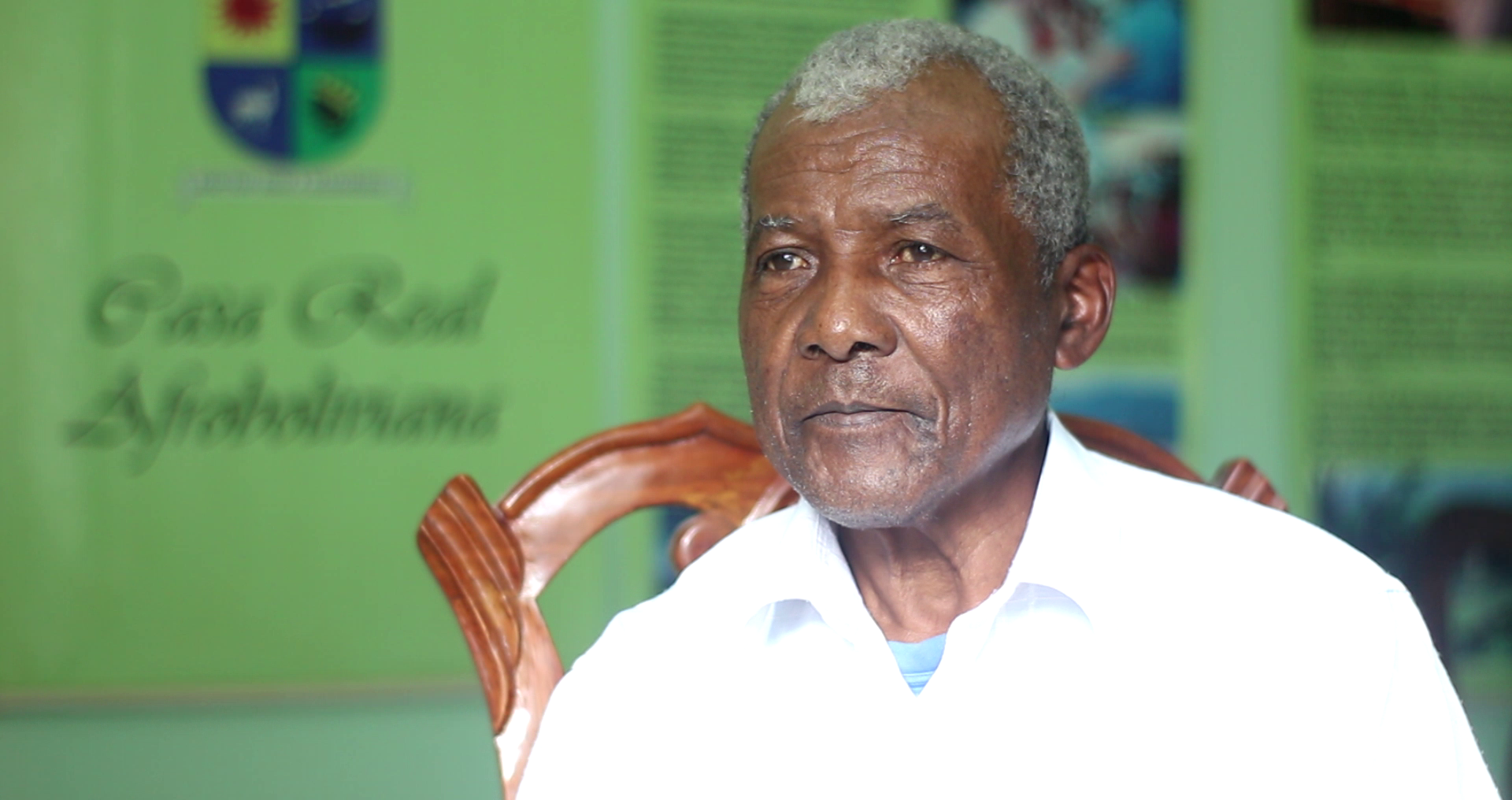
Julio I is the current king of the Afro-Bolivian Royal House.

According to 2024 Bolivian census, the Afro-Bolivian population is 25,168 people, which accounts for 0.22% of the country's total population. Self-identified African descendants in Bolivia account for about 1% of the population. They were brought in during the Spanish colonial times and the majority live in the Yungas.

In 1544, the Spanish Conquistadors discovered the silver mines in a city now called Potosí, which is on the base of Cerro Rico. They began to enslave the natives as workers in the mines. However, the health of the natives working in the mines became very poor, so the Spanish began to bring in enslaved Sub-Saharan Africans to work in the mines. Slaves were brought as early as the 16th century in Bolivia to work in mines. In Potosí during the 17th century 30,000 Africans were brought to work in the mines from which the total population of Potosí which numbered around 200,000. Slaves were more expensive in Bolivia then other parts of the Spanish colonies costing upwards to 800 pesos. This was due to the fact that they had to be bought from slave ports in the coastal region of the Spanish empire and had to trek from cities like Cartagena, Montevideo, and Buenos Aires to Bolivia.

=== Brazil ===
Proportion of Black Brazilians in each department in 2022

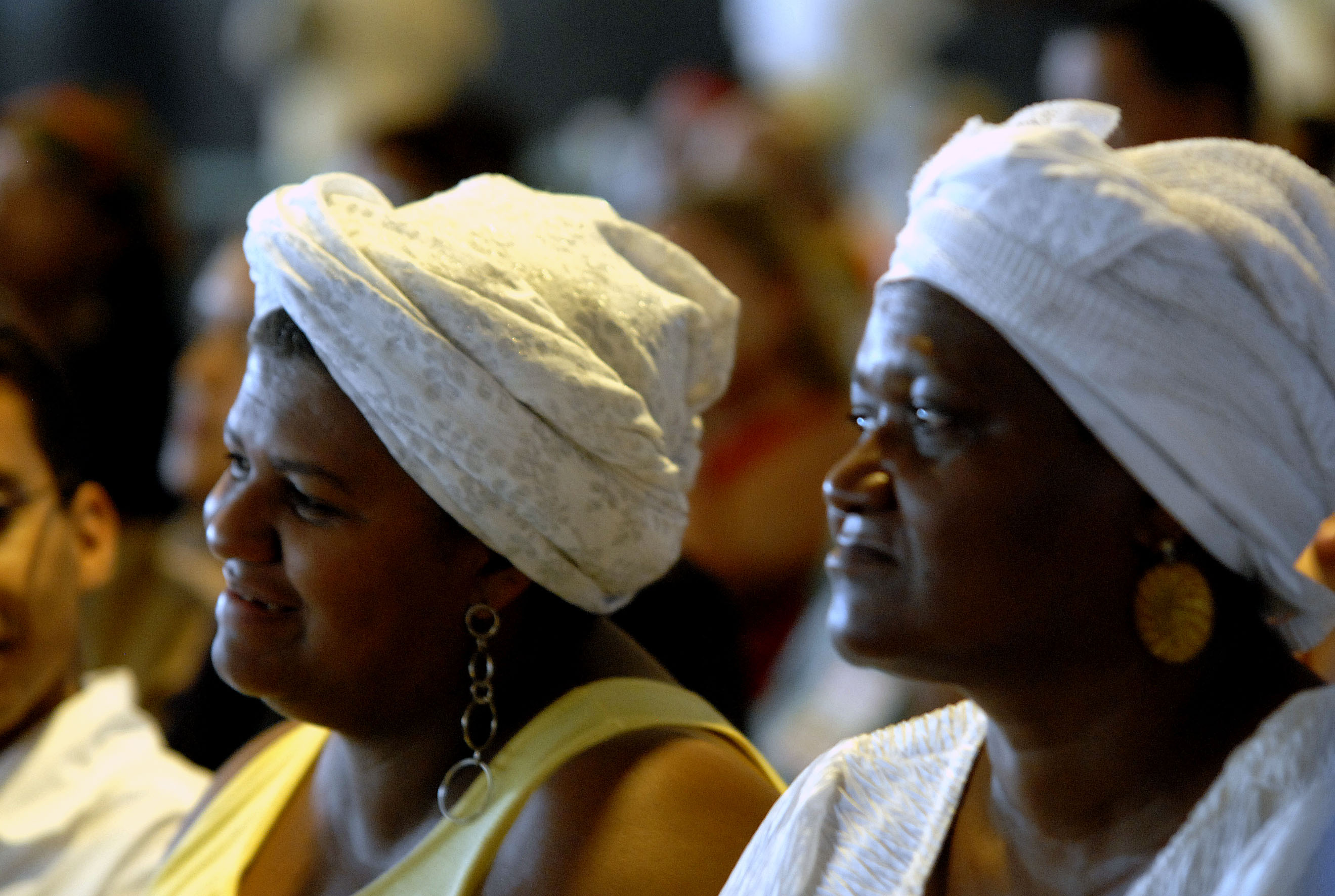
Brazilian Quilombolas during a meeting in the capital of Brazil, Brasília

Around 10% of Brazil's 203 million people reported to the 2022 census as Black, and many more Brazilians have some degree of African descent.

Brazil experienced a long internal struggle over abolition of slavery and was the last Latin American country to do so. In 1850 it finally banned the importation of new slaves from overseas, after two decades since the first official attempts to outlaw the human traffic (in spite of illegal parties of Black African slaves that kept arriving until 1855). In 1864 Brazil emancipated the slaves, and on 28 September 1871, the Brazilian Congress approved the Rio Branco Law of Free Birth, which conditionally freed the children of slaves born from that day on. In 1887 army officers refused to order their troops to hunt runaway slaves, and in 1888 the Senate passed a law establishing immediate, unqualified emancipation. This law, known as Lei Áurea (Golden Law) was sanctioned by the regent Isabel, Princess Imperial of Brazil, daughter of the emperor Pedro II on 13 May 1888.

Preto and pardo are among five ethnic categories used by the Brazilian Institute of Geography and Statistics, along with branco ("white"), amarelo ("yellow", East Asian), and indígena (Native American). In 2022, 10.2% of the Brazilian population, some 20.7 million people, identified as preto, while 45.3% (92.1 million) identified as pardo. Brazilians have a complex classification system based on the prominence of skin and hair pigmentation, as well as other features associated with the concept of race (raça).

The Africans brought to Brazil belonged to two major groups: the West African and the Bantu people. The West Africans mostly belong to the Yoruba people, who became known as the "nagô". The word derives from ànàgó, a derogatory term used by the Dahomey to refer to Yoruba-speaking people. The Dahomey enslaved and sold large numbers of Yoruba, largely of Oyo heritage. Slaves descended from the Yoruba are strongly associated with the Candomblé religious tradition. Other slaves belonged to the Fon people and other neighboring ethnic groups.

Bantu people were mostly brought from present-day Angola and the Congo, most belonging to the Bakongo or Ambundu ethnic groups. Bantu people were also taken from coastal regions of Northern Mozambique. They were sent in large scale to Rio de Janeiro, Minas Gerais, and Northeastern Brazil.

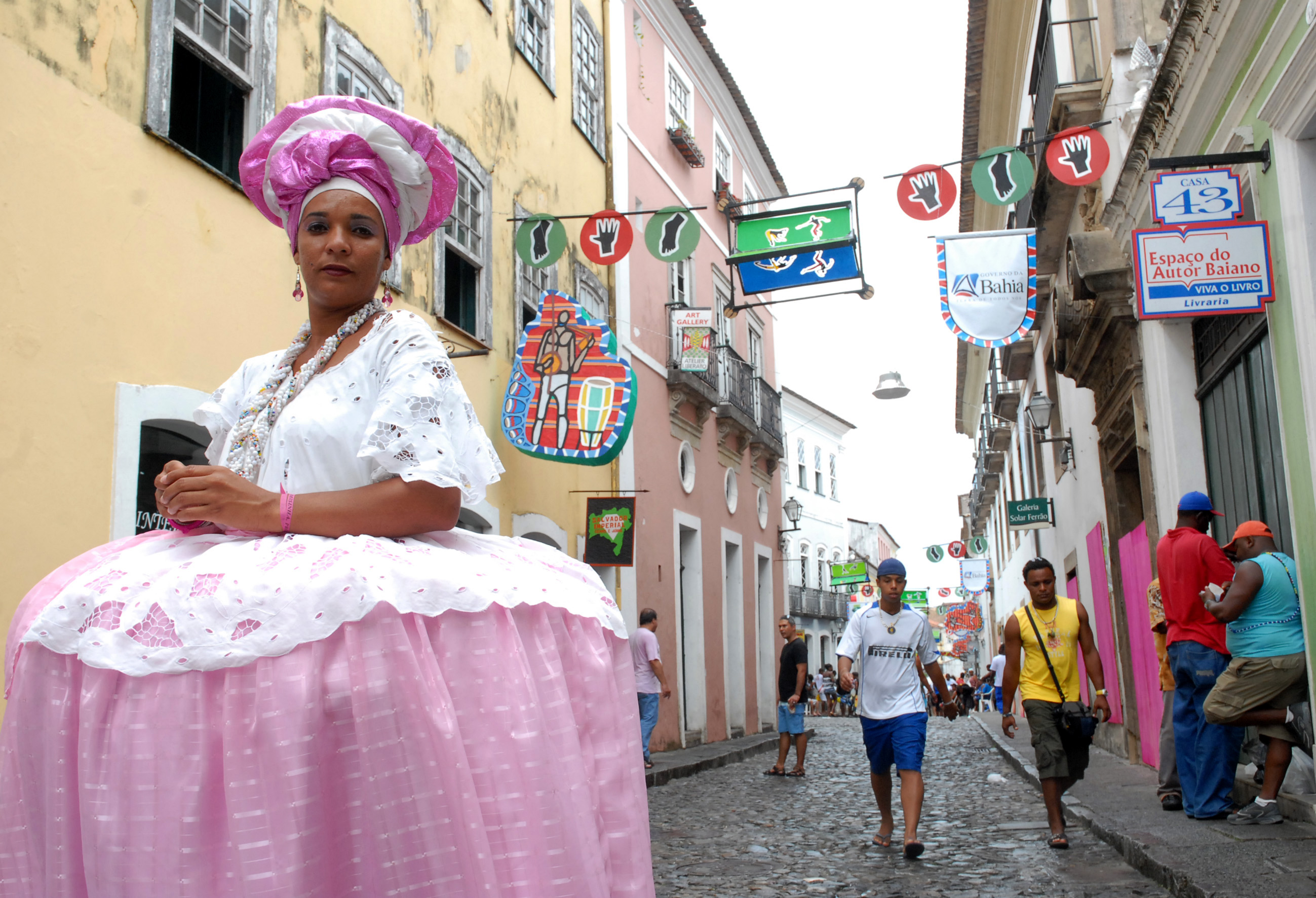
Typical dress of women from Bahia

=== Chile ===
Chile enslaved about 6,000 Africans, about one-third of whom arrived before 1615; most were utilized in agriculture around Santiago. Today there are very few people who identified themselves as Afro-Chileans, at the most, fewer than 0.001% can be estimated from the 2006 population.

In 1984, a study called Sociogenetic Reference Framework for Public Health Studies in Chile, from the Revista de Pediatría de Chile determined an ancestry of 67.9% European, and 32.1% Native American. In 1994, a biological study determined that the Chilean composition was 64% European and 35% Amerindian. The recent study in the Candela Project establishes that the genetic composition of Chile is 52% of European origin, with 44% of the genome coming from Native Americans (Amerindians), and 4% coming from Africa, making Chile a primarily mestizo country with traces of African descent present in half of the population. Another genetic study conducted by the University of Brasília in several American countries shows a similar genetic composition for Chile, with a European contribution of 51.6%, an Amerindian contribution of 42.1%, and an African contribution of 6.3%. In 2015 another study established genetic composition in 57% European, 38% Native American, and 2.5% African.

=== Colombia ===
Population percent of Black Colombians in each municipality in 2005

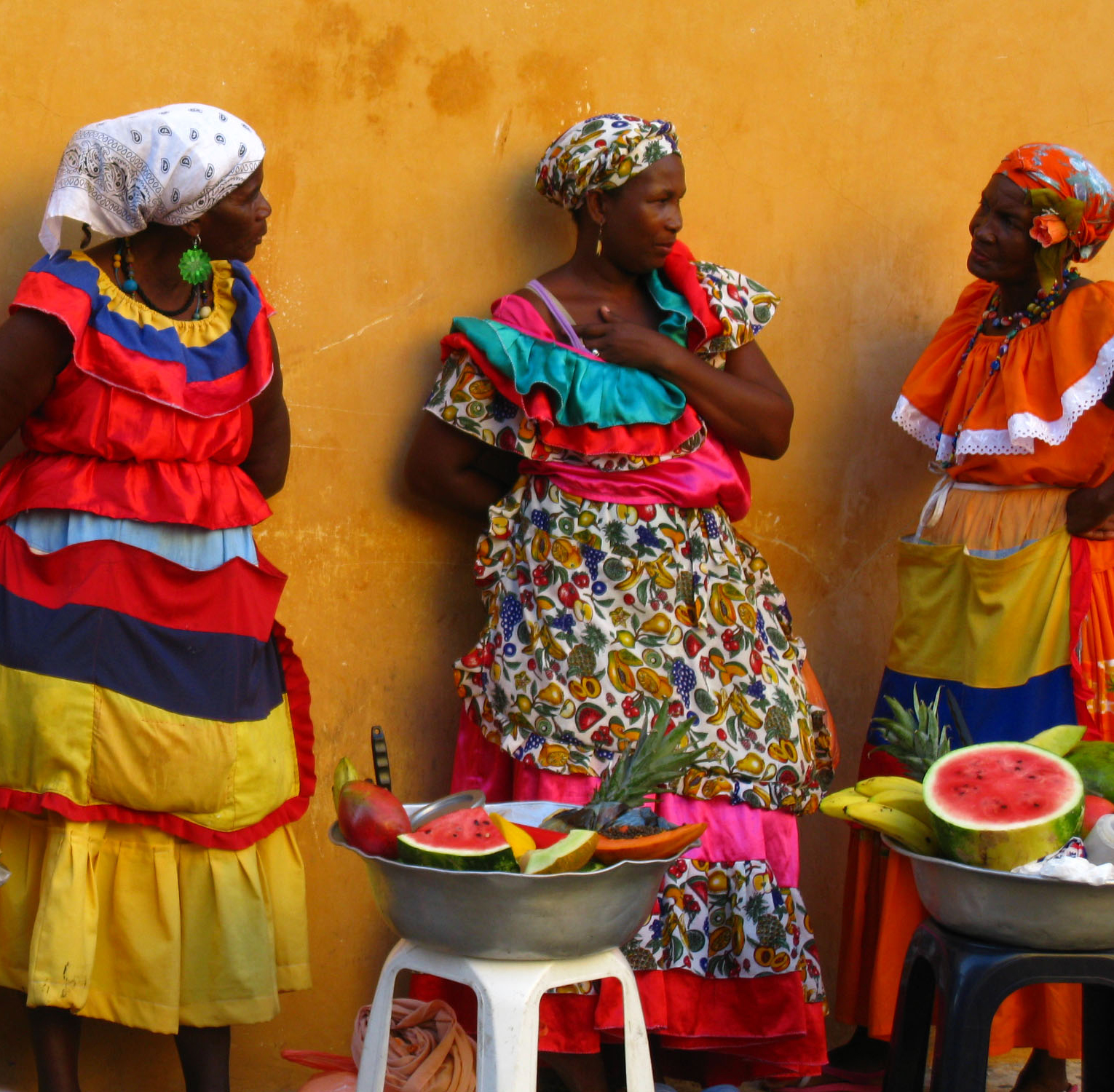
Palenquera women making traditional fruit baskets in the streets of Cartagena

People who were classified as Afro-Colombians make up 9.34% of the population, almost 4.7 million people, according to a projection of the National Administration Department of Statistics (DANE). most of whom are concentrated on the northwest Caribbean coast and the Pacific coast in such departments as Chocó, although considerable numbers are also in Cali, Cartagena, Barranquilla and San Andres Islands.

Approximately 4.4 million Afro-Colombians actively recognize their own black ancestry as a result of inter-racial relations with white and indigenous Colombians. They have been historically absent from high level government positions. Many of their long-established settlements around the Pacific coast have remained underdeveloped. In Colombia's ongoing internal conflict, Afro-Colombians are both victims of violence or displacement and members of armed factions, such as the FARC and the AUC. Afro-Colombians have played a role in contributing to the development of certain aspects of Colombian culture. For example, several of Colombia's musical genres, such as Cumbia, have African origins or influences. Some Afro-Colombians have also been successful in sports such as Faustino Asprilla, Freddy Rincón or María Isabel Urrutia.

San Basilio de Palenque is a village in Colombia that is noted for maintaining many African traditions. It was declared a Masterpieces of the Oral and Intangible Heritage of Humanity by UNESCO in 2005. The residents of Palenque still speak Palenquero, a Spanish/African creole.

=== Ecuador ===
In 2006, Ecuador had a population of 13,547,510. According to the latest data from CIA World Factbook, the classified ethnic groups represented in Ecuador include mestizo (mixed Amerindian and white; 71.9%), Montubio (7.4%), Amerindian (7%), white (6.1%), Afroecuadorian (4.3%), mulato (1.9%), and black (1%). The Afro-Ecuadorian culture is found in the northwest coastal region of Ecuador and make up the majority (70%) in the province of Esmeraldas and the Chota Valley in the Imbabura Province. They can be also found in Ecuador's two largest cities, Quito and Guayaquil. The best known cultural influence known outside Ecuador is a distinctive kind of marimba music. From the Chota Valley there is Bomba (Ecuador) music which is very different from marimba from Esmeraldas.

=== Paraguay ===
Black Paraguayans are descended from enslaved West Africans brought to Paraguay beginning in the 16th century. They became a significant presence in the country, and made up 11% of the population classified in 1785. Most Afro-Paraguayans established communities in towns such as Areguá, Emboscada, and Guarambaré. Many achieved their freedom during the Spanish rule. In the capital Asunción, there is a community of 300 Afro-Paraguayan families in the Fernando de la Mora municipality.

=== Peru ===
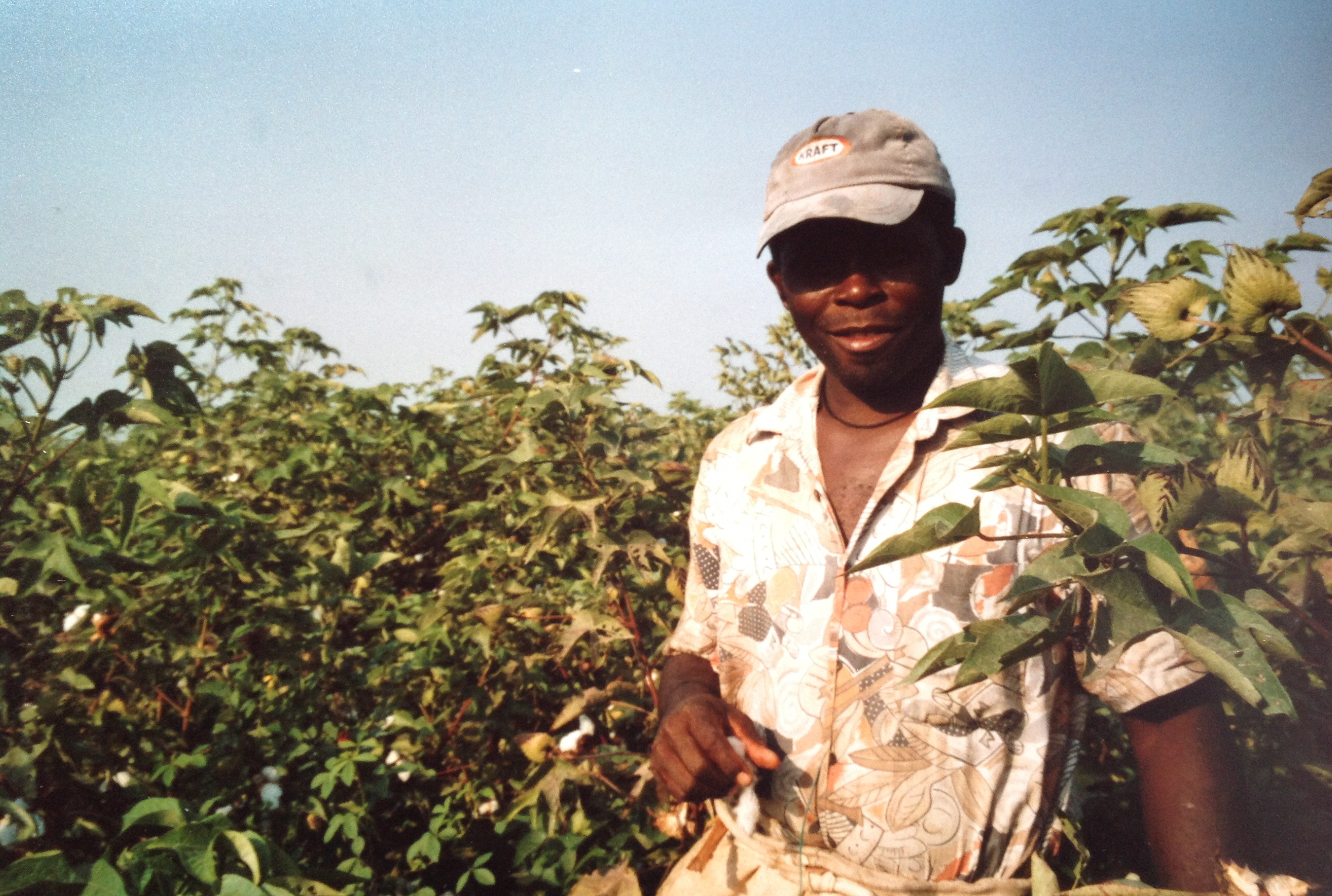
Afro-Peruvian man in El Carmen near Chincha

Some sources classified Afro-Peruvians around to 9% of the Peruvian population (2,850 million)

Over the course of the slave trade, approximately 95,000 slaves were brought into Peru, with the last group arriving in 1850. Today, Afro-Peruvians reside mainly on the central and south coasts. Afro-Peruvians can also be found in significant numbers on the northern coast. Recently, it has been verified that the community with the greatest concentration of Afro-Peruvians is Yapatera in Morropón (Piura), made up of around 7,000 farmers who are largely descended from African slaves of "Malagasy" (Madagascar) origin. They are referred to as "malgaches" or "mangaches".

Afro-Peruvian music and culture was popularized in the 1950s by the performer Nicomedes Santa Cruz. Since 2006, his birthday, 4 June, has been celebrated in Peru as a Day of Afro-Peruvian Culture. Another key figure in the revival of Afro-Peruvian music is Susana Baca. Afro-Peruvian music was actually well known in Peru since the 1600s but oppressed by the Peruvian elite, as was Andean religion and language. Afro-Peruvian culture has not only thrived but influenced all aspects of Peruvian culture despite lacking any acknowledgment from mainstream media or history.

=== Uruguay ===
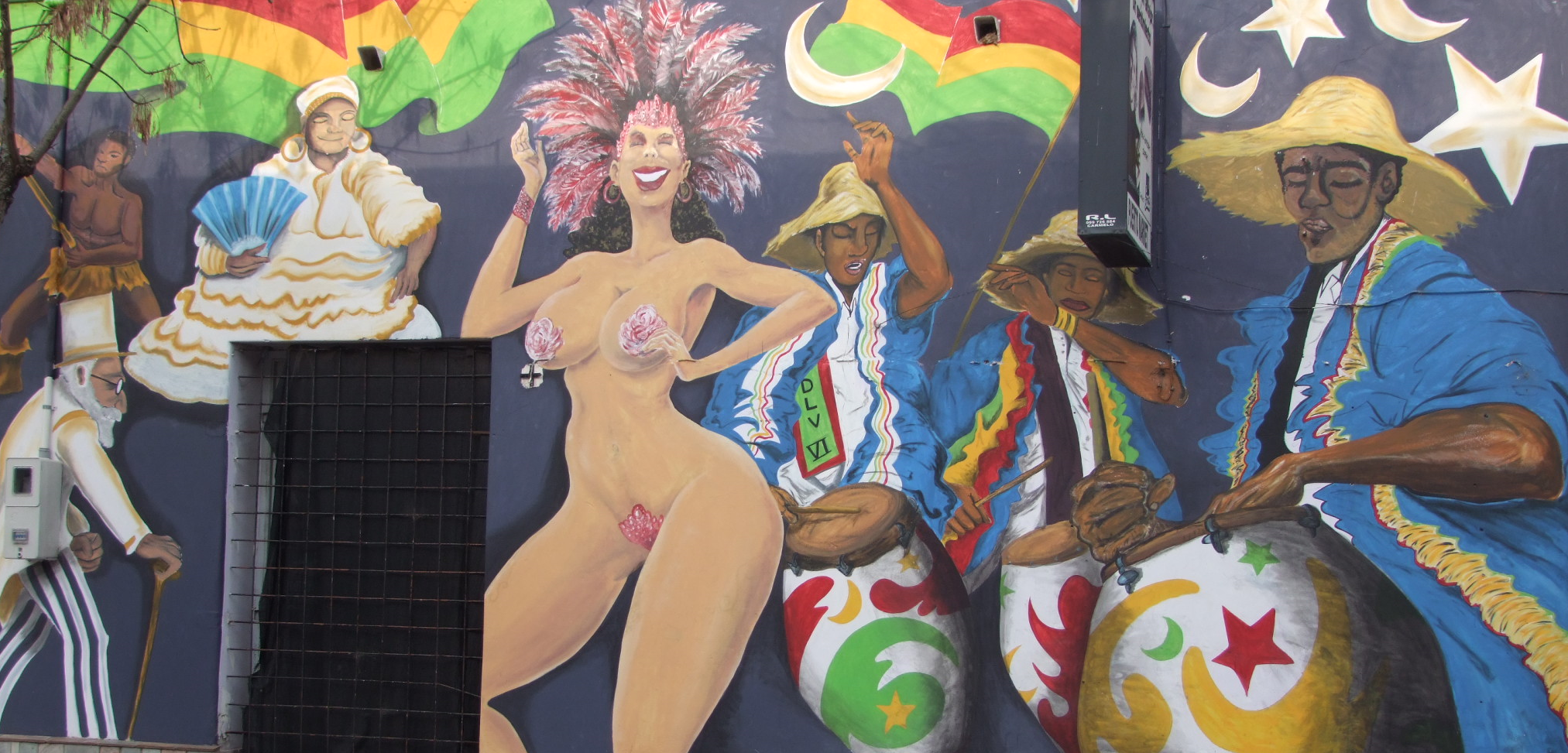
Afro-Uruguayans are a frequent subject of Uruguayan street art, such as this mural near the Port of Carmelo.

A 2009 DNA study in the American Journal of Human Biology showed the genetic composition of Uruguay as primarily European, with Native American ancestry ranging from one to 20 percent and sub-Saharan African "from seven to 15 percent (depending on region)". Enslaved Africans and their descendants figured prominently in the founding of Uruguay.

In the late 18th century, Montevideo became a major arrival port for slaves, most brought from Portuguese colonies of Africa and bound for the Spanish colonies of the New World, the mines of Peru and Bolivia, and the fields of Uruguay. In the 19th century, when Uruguay joined other colonies in fighting for independence from Spain, Uruguayan national hero Jose Artigas led an elite division of black troops against the colonists. One of his top advisors was Joaquín Lenzina, known as Ansina, a freed slave who composed musical odes about his commander's exploits and is regarded by Afro-Uruguayans as an unheralded father of the nation.

=== Venezuela ===
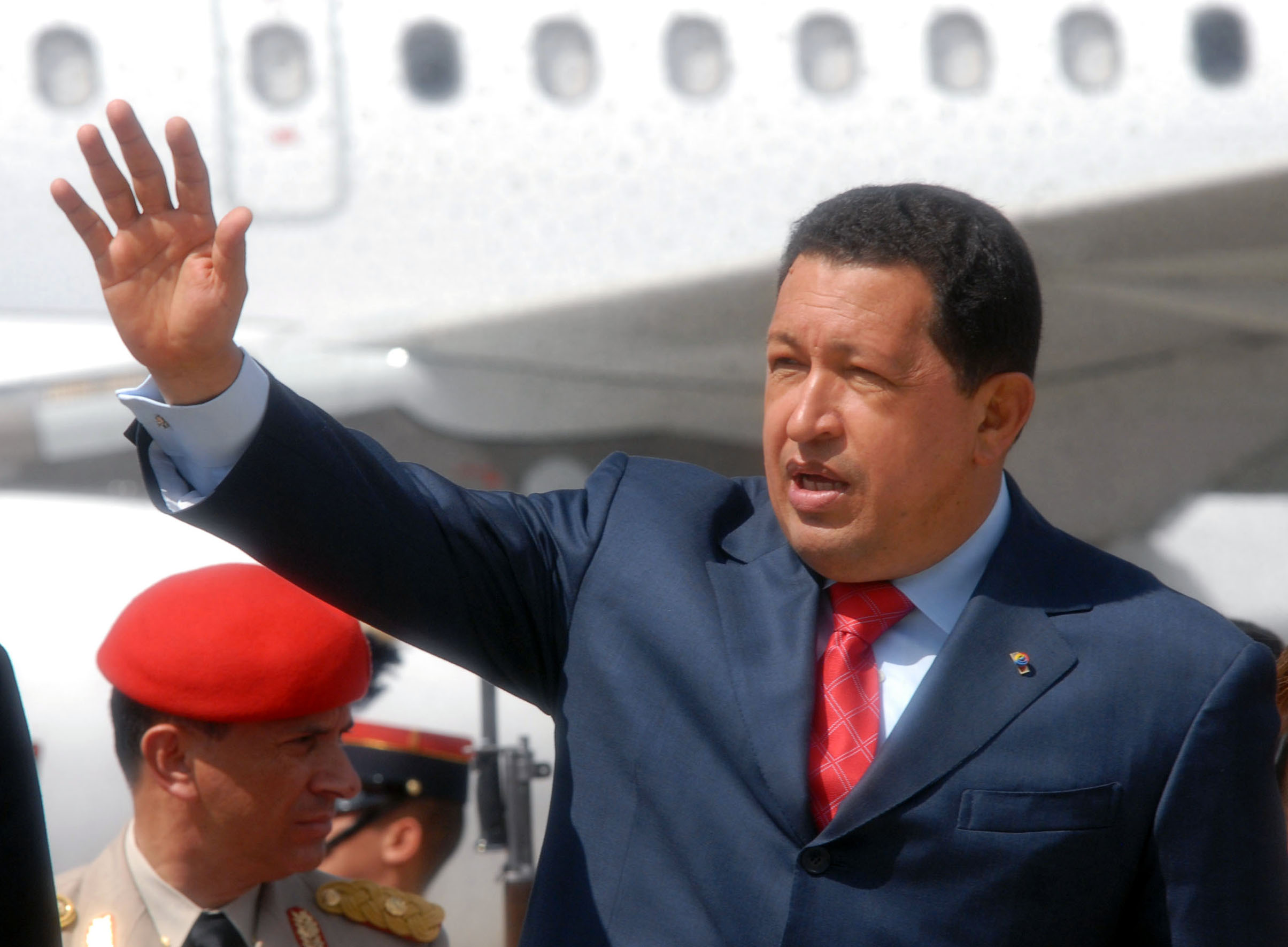
The late President Hugo Chávez was the first afrodescendiente to serve as head of state of Venezuela.

Self-identified Black Venezuelans are mostly descendants of enslaved Africans brought to Venezuela from the 17th to the 19th century to work the coffee and cocoa crops. Most Black Venezuelans live in the North-central region, in the coastal towns Barlovento, Northern Yaracuy, Carabobo and Aragua States, and Eastern Vargas State; but also in several towns and villages in areas in South Lake Maracaibo (Zulia State) and Northern Merida State in the Andes, among others. They have kept their traditions and culture alive, especially through music.

Venezuela is a very racially mixed nation, which makes it difficult to individually identify and/or distinguish their ethno-racial background with precision. Research in 2001 on genetic diversity by the Venezuelan Institute of Scientific Research (Instituto Venezolano de Investigaciones Científicas, IVIC) in which the population was compared to the historical patterns of the colonial castes. According to the last population census in Venezuela conducted by the National Institute Estadististica (INE), 2.8% of the country's population identifies as afrodescendientes of the national total, which is 181 157 result in the number of Venezuelans with African racial characteristics. However, most Venezuelans have some Sub-Saharan African heritage, even if they identify as white.

People who claim to be Afro-Venezuelans have stood out as sportsmen. Many Afro-Venezuelans are in the Major League Baseball and other sports – for example, former NBA/Houston Rockets forward Carl Herrera. However, most of them do not describe themselves as Afro-Venezuelan, but as Latinos or Hispanics or simply Venezuelans. Afro-Venezuelans have also stood out in the arts, especially in music; for example: Magdalena Sánchez, Oscar D'León, Morella Muñoz, Allan Phillips, Pedro Eustache, Frank Quintero, and many others. Miss Venezuela 1998, Carolina Indriago, Miss Venezuela Universe 2006, Jictzad Viña, and Miss Venezuela World 2006, Susan Carrizo are mulatto.

== Central America ==
The Afro–Latin Americans of Central America come from the Caribbean coast. The countries of Belize, Guatemala, Honduras and Nicaragua, are of Garífuna, Afro-Caribbean and/or Mestizo heritage, as well as of Miskito heritage. Those of Costa Rica and Panama are mostly of Afro-Caribbean heritage. Many Afro-Caribbean islanders arrived in Panama to help build the Panama Canal and to Guatemala, Honduras, Nicaragua and Costa Rica to work in the banana and sugar-cane plantations.

=== Belize ===
Belizean culture is a mix of African, European, and Mayan but only 21% of the population is considered to be of African descent. The main community of African descent are the Creoles and Garifuna concentrated from the Cayo District to the Belize District and Stann Creek District (Dangriga) on the Caribbean Sea. Belize City, on the Caribbean coast, is the center of West African culture in Belize, with its population being of mixed Black African, Maya, Miskitu and European.

=== Costa Rica ===
About 8% of the population is of African descent or Mulatto (mix of European and African) who are called Afro-Costa Ricans representing more than 390,000 people spread nowadays all over the country, English-speaking descendants of 19th century Afro-Jamaican immigrant workers. The indigenous population numbers around 2.5%. In the Guanacaste Province, a significant portion of the population descends from a mix of local Amerindians, Africans and Spaniards. Most Afro-Costa Ricans are found in the Limón Province and the Central Valley.

=== El Salvador ===
According to the official data released from the 2024 Population and Housing Census, 25,691 people in El Salvador self-identify as Afro-descendants (approximately 0.4% of the total population). Approximately 10,000 African slaves were brought to El Salvador. The African population, creating Afro-Mestizos in the certain areas where the Africans were brought. El Salvador has no English Antillean (West Indian), Garifuna, and Miskito population, largely due to laws banning the immigration of Africans into the country in the 1930s; these laws were revoked in the 1980s.

=== Guatemala ===
According to the 2018 census, 0.3% of the Guatemalan population identifies as having African ancestry. The main community of African heritage is the Garifuna, concentrated in Livingston and Puerto Barrios. The rest are Afro-Caribbean and mulattoes who live in Puerto Barrios and Morales. All these places belong to the Izabal department, located on the Caribbean coast. Because of unemployment and lack of opportunities, many Garifuna from Guatemala have left the country and moved to Belize and the United States. Also many people of African descent are located in different regions of the country, but most notable are in Amatitlán, San Jerónimo, and Jutiapa, although most of them may not recognize it because the loss of culture in these places. Based on oral local history in San Jeronimo of Alta Vera Paz, it is told that a ship carrying enslaved people from Africa broke on the shores of Guatemala prior to the European invasion. The ship had broken on the shores and the enslaved people became free people with the enslavers dead. The oral history continues to claim that the name Alta Verapaz – the land of " High True Peace" was given to that territory by the Spaniards after conquering the people of African and Mayan descent through religion – the cross – and not the sword as in other parts of Guatemala. The reason is Africans and Mayans had joined forces and defeated the Spanish Sword. Africans and Mayans have also intermarried tracing back generations prior to the Garifuna along the Coast. Many more Africans joined VeraPaz once the Spaniards conquered the area through religion, bringing about large sugar cane plantations that required more laborers, and unfortunately enslaved peoples.

Many of the slaves brought from Africa during colonial times came to Guatemala to work on cotton, sugar cane, tobacco, and coffee plantations. Most were brought as slaves and also servants by European conquistadors. The main reason for slavery in Guatemala was because of the large sugar-cane plantations and haciendas located on Guatemala's Pacific and Caribbean coasts. Slavery didn't last too long during those times and all slaves and servants brought were later freed. They spread to different locations, primarily Guatemala's north, south and east. It is said that these freed slaves later mixed with Europeans, Native Indigenous, and Creoles (Criollos) of non-African descent.

The national folk instrument, the marimba, has its origins in Africa and was brought to Guatemala and the rest of Central America by African slaves during colonial times. The melodies played on it show Native American, West African and European influences in both form and style.

=== Honduras ===
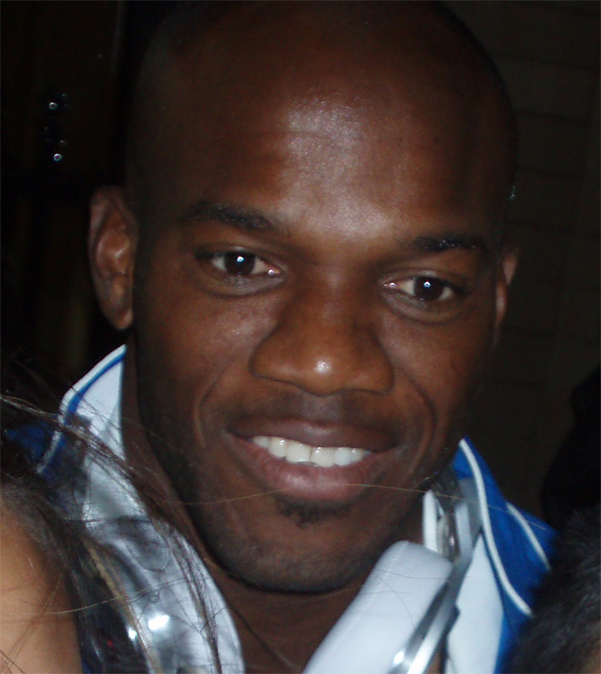
Honduran footballer, David Suazo

According to Henry Gates: "Estimates of people of African descent in Honduras vary widely, from 100,000 to 320,000 (1.8 to 5.8 percent of the country's 5.8 million people in 1994)."

If one uses the blood quantum definition of blackness, then blacks came to Honduras early in the colonial period. One of the mercenaries who aided Pedro de Alvarado in his conquest of Honduras in 1536 was a black slave working as a mercenary to earn his freedom. Alvarado sent his own slaves from Guatemala to work the placer gold deposits in western Honduras as early as 1534. The earliest black slaves consigned to Honduras were part of a license granted to the Bishop Cristóbal de Pedraza in 1547 to bring 300 slaves into Honduras. Honduras has the highest African ancestry in Central America from the Garifuna, Miskitos, Mulattoes, and Africans which make 30% of the country.

The self-identifying black population in Honduras is mostly of West Indian (Antillean origin), descendants of indentured laborers brought from Jamaica, Haiti, and other Caribbean Islands or of Garifuna (or Black Caribs) origin, a people of Black African ancestry who were expelled from the island of Saint Vincent after an uprising against the English and in 1797 and were exiled to Roatan. From there they made their way along the Caribbean coast of Belize, mainland Honduras and Nicaragua. Large Garifuna settlements in Honduras today include Trujillo, La Ceiba, and Triunfo de la Cruz. Even though they only came to Honduras in 1797, the Garifuna are one of the seven officially recognized indigenous groups in Honduras.

Slaves on the north coast mixed with the Miskito Indians, forming a group referred to as the Zambo Miskito. Some Miskito consider themselves to be purely indigenous, denying this Black African heritage. They do not, however, identify as such but rather as mestizo. The Black Creoles of the Bay Islands are today distinguished as an ethnic group for their racial difference from the mestizos and blacks, and their cultural difference as English-speaking Protestants. There has been practically no ethnographic research conducted with this population.

All these circumstances led to a denial by many Hondurans of their Black African heritage which reflects in the census even to this day. "Blacks were more problematic as national symbols because at the time they were neither seen to represent modernity nor autochthony, and their history of dislocation from Africa means they have no great pre-Columbian civilization in the Americas to call upon as symbols of a glorious past. Thus Latin American states often end up with a primarily "Indo-Hispanic" mestizaje where the Indian is privileged as the roots of the nation and blackness is either minimized or completely erased."

=== Nicaragua ===
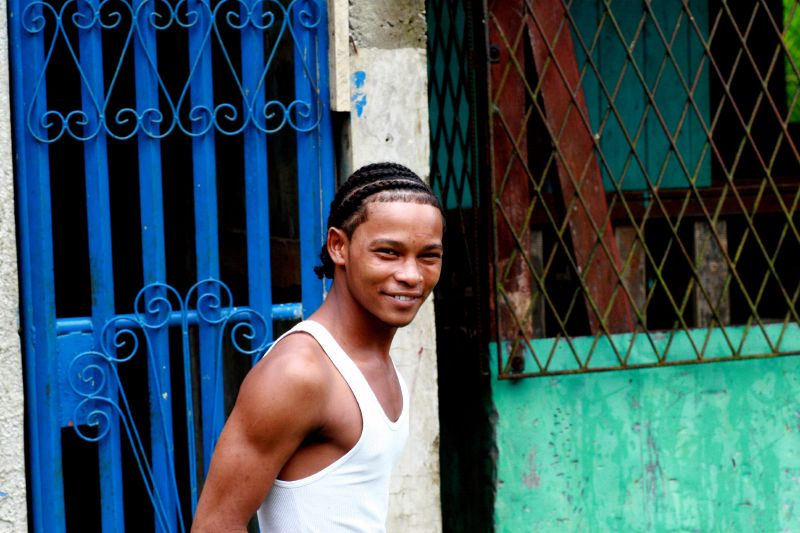
Afro-Nicaraguan creole in Bluefields, Nicaragua.

About 9% of Nicaragua's population is African and mainly reside on the country's sparsely populated Caribbean coast. Afro-Nicaraguans are found on the autonomous regions of RAAN and RAAS. The African population is mostly of West Indian (Antillean) origin, the descendants of laborers brought mostly from Jamaica and other Caribbean islands when the region was a British protectorate. There is also a smaller number of Garífuna, a people of mixed Carib, Angolan, Congolese and Arawak descent. The Garífuna live along in Orinoco, La Fe and Marshall Point, communities settled at Laguna de Perlas.

Five main distinct ethnic groups exist: The Creoles who descend from Anglo-Caribbean countries and many of whom still speak Nicaragua English Creole, the Miskito Sambus descendants of Spanish slaves and indigenous Central Americans who still speak Miskito and/or Miskito Coast Creole, the Garifunas descendents of Zambos (Caribs, Arawaks, and shipwrecked maroons) expelled from St. Vincent who speak Garifuna, the Rama Cay zambos a subset of the Miskito who speak Rama Cay Creole, and the descendants of those enslaved by the Spanish.

=== Panama ===
Black people in Panama are the descendants of West African slaves as well as black people from Caribbean islands who arrived in the early 1900s for the construction of the Panama Canal. The Afro Colonials are the group of Hispanics, while the Antillanos are those of West Indian descent.

Famous Afro-Panamanians include boxer Eusebio Pedroza.

== Caribbean ==
=== Cuba ===
According to a 2001 national census which surveyed 11.2 million Cubans, 1.1 million Cubans described themselves as Black, while 5.8 million considered themselves to be "mulatto" or "mestizo" or "javao" or "moro". Many Cubans still locate their origins in specific African ethnic groups or regions, particularly Yoruba, Congo and Igbo, but also Arará, Carabalí, Mandingo, Fula and others, as well as a small minority of people who migrated in from surrounding Caribbean countries like Haiti and Jamaica.

An autosomal study from 2014 has found out the genetic ancestry in Cuba to be 72% European, 20% African and 8% Native American.

Among the most famous Afro-Cubans are writers Nicolás Guillén, Gastón Baquero, and Nancy Morejón; musicians Celia Cruz and Benny Moré— Compay Segundo, Rubén González, Orlando "Cachaito" López, Omara Portuondo, and Ibrahim Ferrer of the Buena Vista Social Club; jazz musicians including Mario Bauzá, Mongo Santamaría, Chucho Valdés, Gonzalo Rubalcaba, Anga Díaz, X Alfonso, Pablo Milanés; other musicians such as Bebo Valdés, Israel "Cachao" López, Orestes López, Richard Egües, Dámaso Pérez Prado, Christina Milian and Tata Güines; and politicians Juan Almeida and Esteban Lazo.

=== Dominican Republic ===
According to the recent sources, 11% of the Dominican population is black, 16% is white and 73% is mixed from white European and black African and Native American ancestry. Other sources give similar figures, but also without naming a specific study. Other estimates puts the Dominican population at 90% Black and Mulatto, and 10% White.

Some Afrocentric commentators and race/ethnicity scholars have been harshly critical of Dominicans of mixed racial background for their reluctance to self-identify as "Black". However, this reluctance is shared by many people of multiracial background, who find inappropriate to identify with only one side of their ancestry. Those people refuse to express a preference for any of the races that make up their background, and resent being ascribed to any single race.

Dominican culture is a mixture of Taino Amerindian, Spanish European, and West African origins. While Taino influences are present in many Dominican traditions, the European and West African influences are the most noticeable.

Afro-Dominicans can be found all over the island, but they makeup the vast majorities in the southwest, south, east, and the north parts of the country. In El Cibao one can find people of either European, Mixed, and African descent.

Most Afro-Dominicans descend from the Bantu tribes of the Congo region of Central Africa (Angola, Democratic Republic of the Congo and Republic of Congo), and as well as the Ga people of west Ghana.

Notable Dominicans whose physical features suggest full or predominant Black African ancestry include bachata singer Antony Santos, baseball player Sammy Sosa and salsa singer José Alberto "El Canario", and basketballer Al Horford, among others. However, there is no reliable procedure to ascertain the degree, if any, to which their ancestry is Black African.

A system of racial stratification was imposed on Santo Domingo by Spain, as elsewhere in the Spanish Empire.

=== Guadeloupe ===
The population of Guadeloupe, an overseas region of France, is 405,739 (1 January 2013 est.); 80% of the population has African and African-white-Indian mixture which emphasizes its diversity. Their West African ancestors were imported from the Bight of Biafra, West Central Africa and the Guinean Coast for sugar cane plantation labor during the 17th and 18th centuries.

Antillean Creole, which is a French-based creole, is the local language widely spoken among the natives of the island and even the immigrants who have been living on the island for a couple of years. French, the official language, is still the most common language used and heard on the island. Used during more intimate/friendly conversations, Guadeloupean people switch to French, which is their first and native language, when in public.

=== Haiti ===
The population of Haiti is 9.9 million, of which 80% are of African descent while 15-20% is mulatto and white. Slavery in Haiti was established by the Spanish and French colonialists. Many Haitians are descendants of Indigenous peoples who cohabited with the African descendant population.

Haiti is an Afro-Latin nation with strong African contributions to the culture as well as its language, music and religion with a fusion of French and Indigenous, with a sizable degree of Spaniard; all relate and are not limited to its food, art, music, folk religion and other customs. Arab customs are also present in their society today.

=== Martinique ===
The population of Martinique, an overseas region of France, is 390,371 (1 January 2012 est.); 80% of the population has African and African-white-Indian mixture which emphasizes its diversity. Their West African ancestors were imported from the Bight of Biafra, West Central Africa and the Guinean Coast for sugar cane plantation labor during the 17th and 18th centuries.

Antillean Creole, which is a French-based creole, is the local language widely spoken among the natives of the island and even the immigrants who have been living on the island for a couple of years. However, French, the official language, is still the most common language used and heard on the island. Used during more intimate/friendly conversations, Martinican people switch to French, which is their first and native language, when in public.

=== Saint Lucia and Dominica ===
The population of Saint Lucia is 179,651 (2021) and Dominica is 72,412 (2021); 75-85% of the population in both islands has African and African-white-Indian and Kaliango mixture.

The French were the first Europeans to settle on the islands. England and France fought 14 times for control of Saint Lucia and Dominica also went back and forth between France and Britain, and the rule of the islands changed frequently.

Jounen Kwéyòl (Creole Day) is celebrated in the Caribbean islands of Dominica and Saint Lucia, on the last Friday of October and the last Sunday of October to celebrate the mixed culture of the Islands mainly highlighting their French background along with their French/African dialect known on the islands as Kwéyòl. Both islands host cultural events and festivals which showcase different elements of their heritage and culture and they spend time reflecting on the importance of protecting their heritage.

Antillean Creole, which is a French-based creole, is the local language widely spoken among the natives of the islands and even the immigrants who have been living on the island for a couple of years. Dominican and Saint Lucian people switch to English which is their official language to conduct business and education or speak in their native language French Creole, when in public.

=== Puerto Rico ===
According to the 2020 U.S. Census taken in Puerto Rico, 17.1% of Puerto Ricans identified as being white, 7% of the population as being black or African American and 75.3% as mixed or of another ethnicity. An island-wide mitochondrial DNA (mtDNA) study conducted by the University of Puerto Rico at Mayagüez revealed that 61% of Puerto Ricans have maternal Native American ancestry, 26.4% have maternal West or Central African ancestry, and 12.6% have maternal European ancestry. On the other hand, the Y chromosome evidence showed Puerto Ricans' patrilineage to be approximately 75% European, 20% African, and less than 5% indigenous.

An interesting anecdote to consider was that during this whole period, Puerto Rico had laws like the Regla del Sacar or Gracias al Sacar by which a person of African ancestry could be considered legally white so long as they could prove that at least one person per generation in the last four generations had also been legally white descent. Therefore, people of African ancestry with known European lineage were classified as "whites", the opposite of the "one-drop rule" in the United States.

These critics maintain that a majority of Puerto Ricans are ethnically mixed, but do not feel the need to identify as such. They argue, furthermore, that Puerto Ricans tend to assume that they are of African, Native American, and European ancestry and only identify themselves as "mixed" if parents visibly "appear" to be of some other ethnicity. It should also be noted that Puerto Rico underwent a "whitening" process while under U.S. rule. The census-takers at the turn of the 20th Century recorded a huge disparity in the number of "black" and "white" Puerto Ricans (both, erroneous skin classifications) between the 1910 and 1920 censuses. The term "black" suddenly began to disappear from one census to another (within 10 years' time), possibly due to redefinition. It also appears that the "black" element within the culture was simply disappearing possibly due to the popular idea that in the U.S. one could only advance economically and socially if one were to pass for "white".

Misinformation of ethnic populations within Puerto Rico also existed under Spanish rule, when the Native American (Taino) populations were recorded as being "extinct". Biological science has now rewritten their history books. These tribes were not voluntary travelers, but have since blended into the mainstream Puerto Rican population (as all the others have been) with Taino ancestry being the common thread that binds.

Many persons of African descent in Puerto Rico are found along coastal areas, especially in the northeast of the island, areas traditionally associated with sugar cane plantations. These Afro-Puerto Ricans make up a significant percentage of the population especially in the cities and towns of San Juan, Loiza, Carolina, Patillas, Canóvanas, Maunabo, Río Grande, Culebra, Luquillo, Cataño, Ceiba, Juncos, Fajardo, and Guayama. African ancestry, and Puerto Ricans of notable African descent are found throughout the island, although they might not regularly associate themselves with an American concept of blackness. Due to the DNA evidence that is being presented by UPR at Mayaguez, many African bloodlines have also been recorded in the central mountains of the island, though not written in the Spanish history books of the time. Consequently, Taino bloodlines have begun appearing in the coastal towns. All of this suggests that escaped enslaved Africans ran off to the mountains to escape the slaveowners, while some Tainos remained close to their main staple food, fish.

The Puerto Rican musical genres of bomba and plena are of West African and Caribbean origin, respectively; they are danced to during parties and West African-derived festivals. Most Puerto Ricans who have African ancestry are descendants of enslaved Congo, Yoruba, Igbo and Fon from West and Central Africa. After the abolition of slavery in 1873 and the Spanish–American War of 1898, a number of African Americans have also migrated and settled in Puerto Rico.

Three of the most famous Afro–Latin Americans are Puerto Rican Boxer Felix "Tito" Trinidad, Hall of Fame baseball player Roberto Clemente and Bernie Williams-Figueroa Jr., New York Yankees outfielder and jazz guitarist.

== North America ==
=== Mexico ===
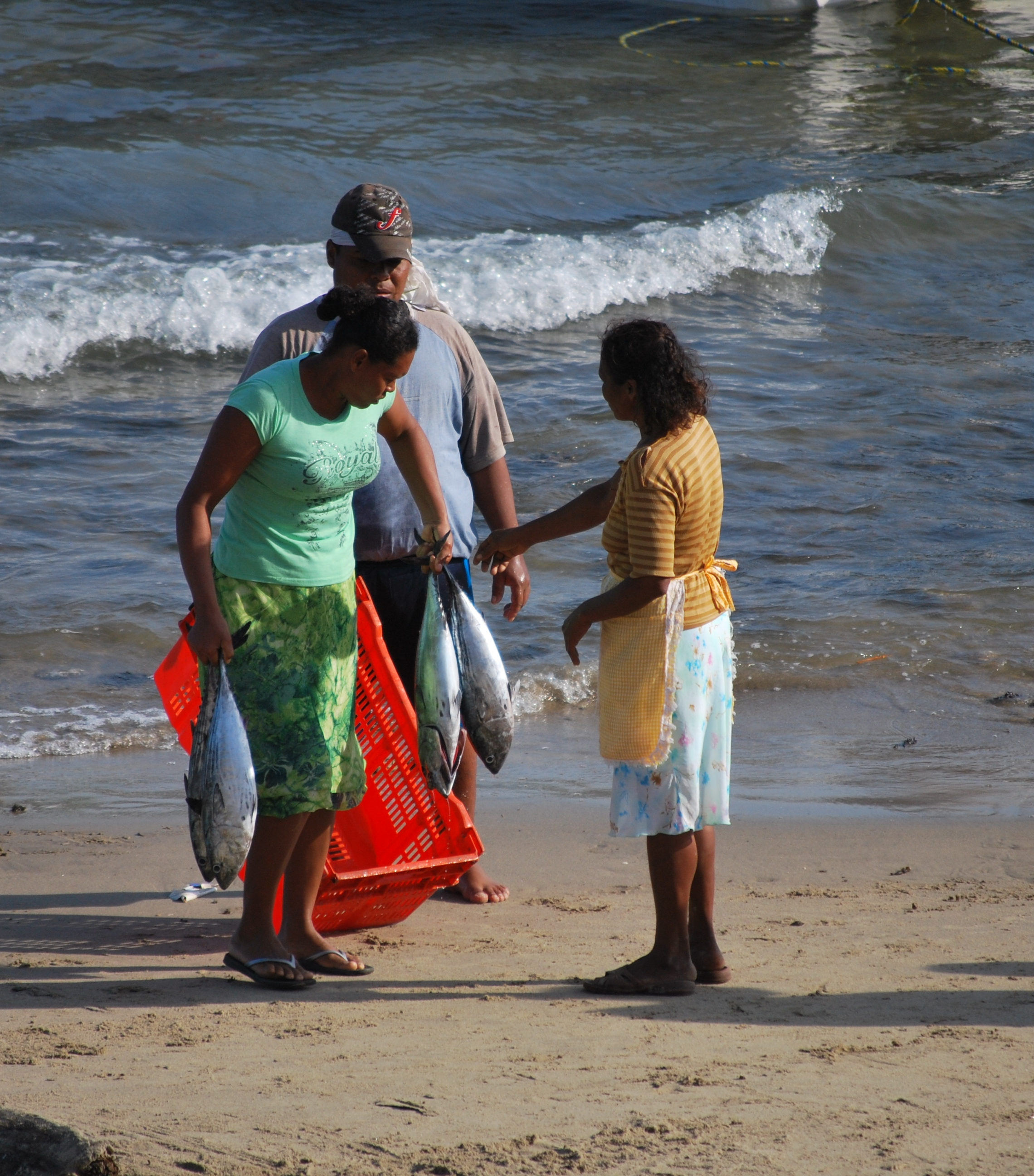
Afromestizos in Punta Maldonado, Cuajinicuilapa, Guerrero

The vast majority of contemporary Afro-Mexicans inhabit the south central & southern region of Mexico; those who migrated north in the colonial period assimilated into the general population. Some Afro-Mexican facts:

- Mexico's second president, Vicente Guerrero, an Afro-Mexican, issued an official decree abolishing slavery and emancipating all slaves in 1821, during his short term as president. He also attempted to change the Official Census by aiming to get rid of the "race" category.
- Race was considered for the first time by the Encuesto Intercensal in 2015, which revealed that 1.2% of Mexicans identify as Afro-Mexican. Over half of these individuals also identified as indigenous.
- Gaspar Yanga founded the first free African township in the Americas in 1609.
- A Black man named Esteban el Negro (Steven the Black), a North African Moor from Spain, searched for the fabled city of Cíbola with Cabeza de Vaca.
- Veracruz, Campeche, Pánuco and Acapulco were the main ports for the entrance of African slaves.
- In the past, offspring of Black African/Amerindian mixtures were called jarocho (wild pig), chino or lobo (wolf). Today jarocho refers to all inhabitants of the state of Veracruz, without regard to ancestry.
- According to the 2020 INEGI census, the country's population is now 2.4-3%

=== United States ===
Many Afro-Latino immigrants have arrived, in waves, over decades, to the United States, especially from the Caribbean, Cuba, Haiti, Dominican Republic and Puerto Rico. In the state of California, the dominant population consisted of people of color, but as the years progressed the percentage has declined severely (or at least the way Californian residents claim to identify themselves has shifted towards a White population). A Pew Research Center survey of Latino adults shows that one-quarter of all U.S. Latinos self-identify as Afro-Latino, Afro-Caribbean or of African descent with roots in Latin America. This is the first time a nationally representative survey in the U.S. has asked the Latino population directly whether they considered themselves Afro-Latino. According to another Pew Research Center survey, "Afro-Latino: A deeply rooted identity among U.S. Hispanics" show some more statistics on how Afro-Latinos identify. As of October 2014, 39% of U.S. Afro-Latinos identify as white, 24% of them identify as just Hispanic, 18% as Black, 9% as mixed, and 4% as American Indian. Among the Chicano/a population, people who are both Black and Chicano/a may identify as AfroChicano/a. A May 2022 Pew Research Center survey stated that 12% of adult Latinos identified themselves as Afro-Latino, comprising an estimated total of six million people.

== Distribution ==
Region / Country	Population	% Black African (official census)	% Mixed Black African (official census)	% Black African (est.)	% Mixed Black African (est.)	Total Afro Latin American population (est.)
Caribbean						+29,504,000
Haiti	11,470,271	—	—	95	~5	+10,896,000
Dominican Republic	10,790,744	—	—	10	75	9,172,000
Cuba	10,985,984	9.3	26.6	11	51	6,811,000
Puerto Rico	3,057,311	7	10.5	65		1,987,000
Guadeloupe	368,900	—	—	10	76.7	319,000
Martinique	346,000	—	—	92.4		319,000
Central America						7,980,000
Honduras	9,551,352	1.39		4.6	16.8	2,043,000
Panama	4,404,108	31.7		5	41	2,025,000
Guatemala	17,980,803	0.19	0.13	1.1	5.3	1,150,000
Costa Rica	5,256,612	1.05	6.72	4	16.6	1,082,000
Nicaragua	6,359,689	2.79		7.1	4.3	725,000
El Salvador	6,602,370	0.13	—	2.7	5	508,000
South America						137,824,000
Brazil	218,689,757	10.2	45.3	6.2	39.1	99,066,000
Venezuela	30,518,260	3.6	51.6	2.8	37.7	12,359,000
Colombia	52,336,454	9.43	15.44	4	21	12,967,500
Peru	32,440,172	3.6		—	9.7	3,146,000
Argentina	46,621,847	0.66		0.66		302,936
Ecuador	17,483,326	4.8		5	5	1,748,000
Uruguay	3,416,264	4.6	3.2	8.4		286,000
Paraguay	7,439,863	0.13		—	3.5	260,000
Bolivia	12,186,079	0.2		—	2	243,000
French Guiana	294,900	—	—	66		194,000
Chile	18,459,457	0.06		0.4	0.6	184,000
North America						11,395,000
United States	337,341,954	0.4		2		6,746,000
Mexico	129,150,971	2.04		1.5	2.1	4,649,000

== Noted Afro-Latin American people ==
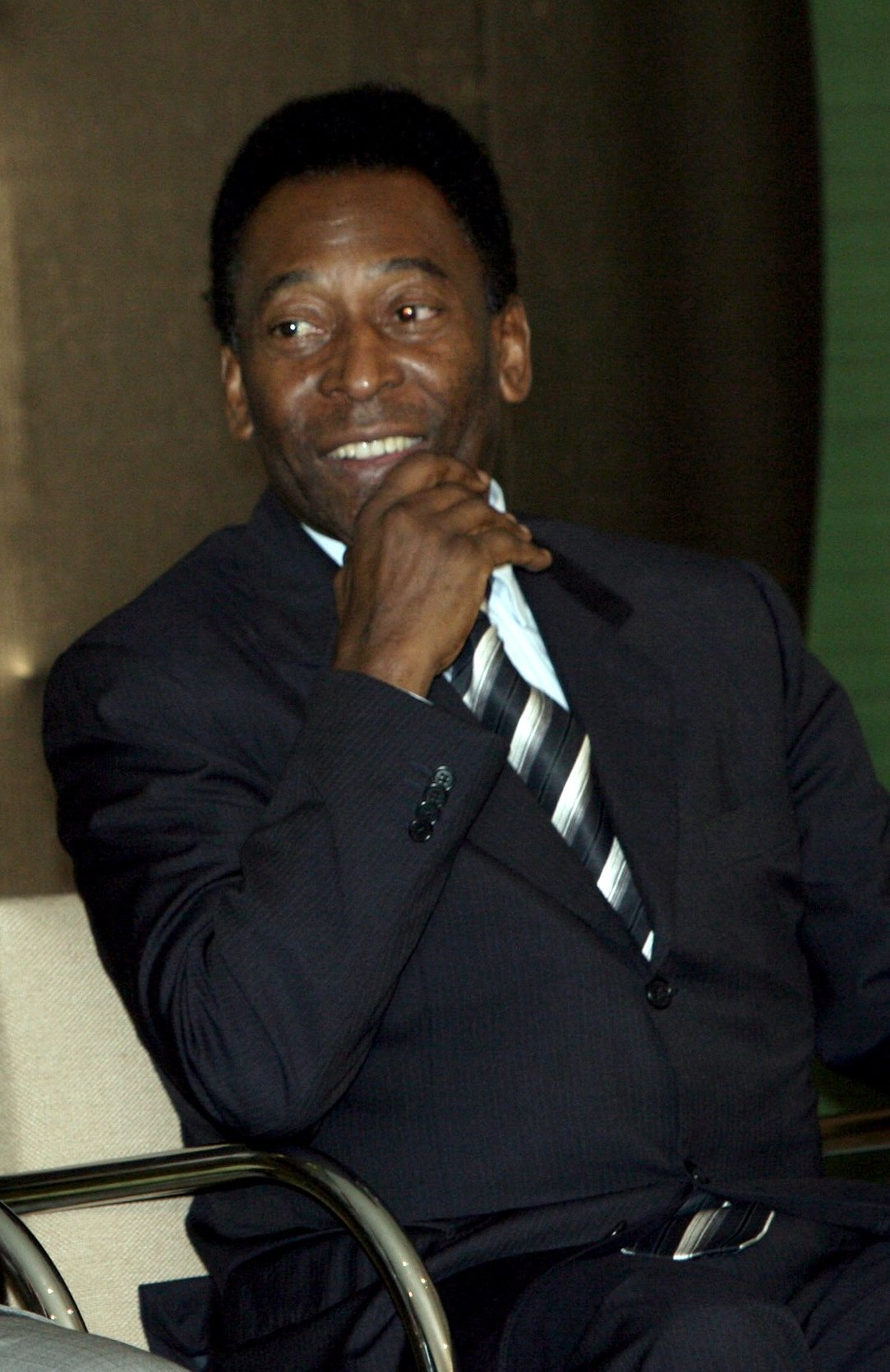
Pelé was an Afro-Brazilian.

- Alessandro Santos – Brazilian football player
- Amara La Negra – Dominican singer, reality star and activist
- Anderson Salles – Brazilian football player
- André Bahia – Brazilian football player
- Anténor Firmin – Haitian anthropologist, journalist, and politician
- Antônio Géder – Brazilian football player
- Lt. General José Antonio de la Caridad Maceo y Grajales – second-in-command of the Cuban Army of Independence
- Ary Borges – Brazilian football player
- Beatriz de Palacios – an Afro-Spanish soldier, nurse and explorer during the Spanish conquest of the Aztec Empire
- Brian Flores – Honduran American Football coach for the Miami Dolphins in the NFL
- Bruno Cortez – Brazilian football player
- Bruno Henrique – Brazilian football player
- Bruno Viana – Brazilian football player
- Carlos Alberto – Brazilian football player
- Carlos Gilberto Nascimento Silva – Brazilian football player
- Carlos Santos de Jesus – Brazilian football player
- Celia Cruz – Cuban singer of Latin music
- Christina Milian – Cuban-American singer-songwriter and actress
- Clara Nunes – Brazilian singer
- Claudemir Jerônimo Barreto – Brazilian football player
- Dania Ramirez – Dominican-American actress
- Danilo dos Santos de Oliveira – Brazilian football player
- Darlan Cunha – Brazilian actor
- Dascha Polanco – Dominican actress
- David Green – Afro-Nicaraguan–born American MLB Player
- David Ortiz – Dominican-American former MLB player for the Boston Red Sox and the Minnesota Twins
- Dianne Morales (born 1967) – American non-profit executive and political candidate
- Douglas Franco Teixeira – Brazilian football player
- Douglas Silva – Brazilian actor
- Edwidge Danticat – award-winning Haitian American novelist
- Ebert Willian Amâncio – Brazilian football player
- Eliezer Gomes – Brazilian actor
- Estevanico – The first person of African descent to explore North America and the first non-Native to visit Pueblo lands.
- Fernando Luiz Roza – Brazilian football player
- Formiga – Brazilian football player
- Frederico Rodrigues de Paula Santos – Brazilian football player
- Gabriel Magalhães – Brazilian football player
- Gerson Santos da Silva – Brazilian football player
- Gilberto Gil – Brazilian singer and politician
- Gina Torres – Cuban-American actress
- Grande Otelo – Brazilian actor
- Hanna Gabriel – Costa Rican junior middleweight boxer with several international victories
- Immortal Technique – Afro-Peruvian-American rapper and activist
- Hilton Moreira – Brazilian football player
- Jair Ventura Filho – Brazilian football player
- Jean-Michel Basquiat – Haitian American artist
- Jemerson de Jesus Nascimento – Brazilian football player
- João Alves – Brazilian football player
- Johnny Laboriel – Mexican singer
- Jonathan Cafú – Brazilian football player
- José María Morelos – Mexican Roman Catholic priest and revolutionary rebel leader in the Mexican War of Independence
- Juan Garrido – Conquistador who established the first commercial wheat farm in the Americas
- Juan Gualberto Gómez – Afro-Cuban revolutionary leader in the Cuban War of Independence against Spain
- Juan Latino – The first Black African to attend a European university, ultimately achieving the status of professor.
- Juan Silveira dos Santos – Brazilian football player
- Juan Valiente – Black conquistador who participated in the expeditions of Pedro de Alvarado in present-day Guatemala and Pedro de Valdivia in Chile.
- Jucilei da Silva – Brazilian football player
- Julio Teherán (born 1991) – MLB baseball player
- June Beer – Afro-Nicaraguan artist and poet
- Kalimba Marichal – Mexican singer/songwriter
- Kléber de Carvalho Corrêa – Brazilian football player
- Lázaro Ramos – Brazilian actor
- Leônidas da Silva – Brazilian football player
- Lincoln Henrique – Brazilian football player
- Luiz Adriano – Brazilian football player
- Luiz Paulo Hilário – Brazilian football player
- Maicosuel Reginaldo de Matos – Brazilian football player
- Machado de Assis – Brazilian novelist, poet, playwright and short story writer
- Marcelo Antônio Guedes Filho – Brazilian football player
- Maria Bethânia – Brazilian MPB singer
- Marcos Arouca da Silva – Brazilian football player
- María del Tránsito Sorroza – Afro-Ecuadorian midwife and formerly enslaved woman
- Saint Martin de Porres, O.P. – Peruvian lay brother of the Dominican Order, beatified and later canonized
- Mellow Man Ace – Afro-Cuban American Rapper
- Margareth Menezes – Brazilian singer from Salvador, Bahia
- Moisés Roberto Barbosa – Brazilian football player
- Neuciano de Jesus Gusmão – Brazilian football player
- Nilo Peçanha – Brazilian politician, Governor of Rio de Janeiro State, vice-president of Brazil then president of Brazil
- Oscar D'Leon – Venezuelan musician of salsa music
- Patrick de Paula – Brazilian football player
- Pedro A. Campos – Puerto Rican attorney, politician, and leading figure in the Puerto Rican independence movement
- Pelé – Brazilian professional footballer who played as a forward
- Ramires Santos do Nascimento – Brazilian football player
- Raúl Cuero – Colombian professor of microbiology
- Robinho – Brazilian football player
- Robson Bambu – Brazilian football player
- Ronaldinho – Brazilian professional footballer who played as a midfielder and as a forward
- Rosario Dawson – American actress, of Afro-Cuban heritage
- Rubén Rada – Afro-Uruguayan percussionist, composer and singer
- Selenis Leyva – Cuban-American actress
- Sidnei Rechel da Silva Júnior – Brazilian football player
- Susana Baca – Peruvian singer-songwriter, teacher, folklorist, ethnomusicologist and Latin Grammy Award winner
- Teresa Chikaba – African princess, captured by Spanish traders and brought to Spain, where she was enslaved. Also known as Teresa Juliana de Santo Domingo.
- Vágner Love – Brazilian football player
- Vicente Guerrero – leading revolutionary general of the Mexican War of Independence who later served as President of Mexico
- Vinícius Júnior – Brazilian football player
- Wifredo Lam – Cuban artist who sought to portray and revive the Afro-Cuban spirit and culture
- Willian Borges da Silva – Brazilian football player
- Yasiel Puig – Cuban-born American MLB baseball player
- Zé Roberto – Brazilian football player
- Zoe Saldaña – American Actress

== See also ==
- African Americans
- African diaspora
- Blaxican
- Black Hispanic and Latino Americans
