= Black Hispanic and Latino Americans =

Ethnic group

Estadounidenses negros hispanos y latinos Américains noirs hispaniques et latinos Estadounidenses negros hispânicos e latinos Ameriken nwa panyòl ak latino

Total population
- 1,163,862; 0.4% of the total U.S. population (2020); 2.0% of all Black People (2020); 1.9% of all Hispanic and Latino Americans (2020)

Regions with significant populations
- New York, Massachusetts, Rhode Island, Pennsylvania, Connecticut and Florida

Languages
- American English • Spanish language in the United States • Spanish creole • Spanglish • Nuyorican English • Haitian Creole

Religion
- Roman Catholicism, but also Protestantism, Judaism, Santería and African diasporic religions

Related ethnic groups
- African Americans • Afro-Caribbeans • Afro–Latin Americans and other Latin Americans • Black people and African ethnic groups • Hispanic and Latino Americans and other ethnic groups of the United States •

Black Hispanic and Latino Americans, also called Afro-Hispanics, Afro-Latinos, Black Hispanics, or Black Latinos, are classified by the United States Census Bureau, Office of Management and Budget, and other U.S. government agencies as Black people living in the United States with ancestry in Latin America or Spain and/or who speak Spanish.

Hispanidad, which is independent of race, is the only ethnic category, as opposed to racial category, which is officially collated by the U.S. Census Bureau. The distinction made by government agencies for those within the population of any official race category, including “Black”, is between those who report Hispanic backgrounds and all others who do not. Non-Hispanic Black people consist of an ethnically diverse collection of all others who are classified as Black or African American that do not report Hispanic ethnic backgrounds.

== History ==
The Hispanic model of identity and representation has been historically characterized by its multi-faceted nature, which transcends strict racial categorizations. Numerous figures exemplify this complexity, including Martín de Porres, Beatriz de Palacios, Spanish conquistador Juan Garrido that established the first commercial wheat farm in the Americas, Estevanico, Francisco Menendez, Juan de Villanueva, Juan Valiente, Juan Beltrán de Magaña, Pedro Fulupo, Juan Bardales, Antonio Pérez, Gómez de León, Leonor Galiano, Teresa Juliana de Santo Domingo and Juan García. Additionally, Juan Latino stands out as a significant figure in this discourse; he is recognized as the first black African to attend a European university, ultimately achieving the status of professor. This highlights the notion that the Hispanic identity is not monolithic and is instead enriched by diverse contributions across racial and ethnic lines. Such examples serve to challenge simplistic perceptions of race within the historical narrative of Hispanic culture.

== Demographics ==
New York, Massachusetts, Pennsylvania, Maryland, Delaware, District of Columbia, New Jersey, Connecticut, Florida, & Rhode Island have some of the highest percentages of Hispanics identifying as Black, where up to 15% of Hispanics identify as black, compared to 1.9% of Hispanics nationwide. Overall, the Northeast region has the largest concentration of Black Hispanics; this is partly because of the large Puerto Rican, Dominican, and other mostly or partly African descended Hispanic populations in the region.

Black Hispanics numbered 1,163,862 and accounted for 1.9% of the entire U.S. Hispanic population in 2020, down from 1,243,471. Additionally, according to Jessica E. Peña, Ricardo Henrique Lowe, Jr. and Merarys Ríos-Vargas (2023), the U.S. Census Bureau, for the 2020 Census, recoded, or categorized, data for this population into multiple categories which allowed those who are multiracial, Black Hispanics to also be counted. When including individuals who are multiracial, Black Hispanics, the population count increases to 2.6 million people. The authors show that different categorizations create different understandings of the size of the community.

Most Black Hispanics in the United States come from within the Dominican and Puerto Rican populations. Aside from the Dominican Republic and Puerto Rico, large numbers of Black Hispanics can also be found in populations originating from northern South America, and the Caribbean coast of Central America as well, including the Panamanian and Colombian (usually from western Colombia’s Chocó Department) communities, as well as the Garifuna people especially from Honduras, and to a lesser extent, the Cuban community.

Because views of race in Latin America and the United States are slightly different, there is a fluidity in identifying with terms such as “black” or “Afro Latino” among Latinos in the United States. Recent immigrants from Latin America are more likely to embrace mixed identities (mestizaje) while thinking less of their African side, and some immigrant Latinos who are full black with little to no admixture do not identify as black. In contrast, Latinos who have lived in the United States for several generations are more likely to adopt urban afrocentric mentalities from African Americans and abandon that of their home countries, embracing the One-drop rule. This is especially true for large portions of the Puerto Rican and now Dominican communities on the East Coast. Some white and mixed Latinos who are Americanized, in effect to embracing African American Hip Hop culture and the One drop rule, self-identify as “Afro Latino” (black).

The main aspects which distinguish Black Hispanics born in the United States of America from African Americans is having Spanish as their mother tongue or most recent ancestors’ native language, their culture passed down by their parents, and their Spanish surnames. Of all Hispanic groups, Puerto Ricans have the closest relationship with the African American community. As a result of this, there is also increasing intermarriages and offspring between non-Hispanic black people and Hispanics of any race, mainly between Puerto Ricans and African Americans, which increases both the Hispanic ethnic and black racial demographics.

In May 2022, Pew Research Center reported that there were an estimated six million Afro-Latino people in the United States, comprising 2% of the adult U.S. population, and 12% of adult Latinos. They also stated that one-in-seven Afro-Latinos did not “identify as Hispanic” and that 30% of Afro-Latino adults were 18 to 29. The report also stated that Afro-Latinos are more likely to be from Puerto Rico and the Dominican Republic than from Mexico, noting that 40% of people had their families talk about challenges they’d face for their ethnic identity when they grew up, and that the “racial groups Afro-Latinos identify with can be varied and diverse.” In the latter case, the report stated that about 30% of Afro-Latinos identified as White, 25% as Black, 23% as “some other race,” 16% as “multiple races” and 1% as Asians.

== Health ==
A review of twenty-one studies found Black Hispanics to have poorer health compared to White Hispanics. The causes are still unknown, but researchers suggested that racial discrimination and segregation may contribute to racial health differences among the Hispanic population in the United States. Environmental racism continues to be a major cause of racialized health disparities in the United States. For example, over 5 million people of color live within 1.8 miles of hazardous waste facilities. Furthermore, Air pollution in low income communities of color continues to be an issue in places such as the Bronx where Sulfur Dioxide (SO2) levels have caused high rates of childhood asthma Another big environmental issue is access to clean water. For example, in Flint, Michigan lead contaminated water has led to major health issues that disproportionately affect African American, and Latino American communities. Some of these issues include elevated levels of lead found in blood, rashes, hair loss, as well as congenital disabilities. This combined with socio-economic, language, and documentation barriers that restrict the access of adequate health care makes these populations more vulnerable to health issues compared to white Americans.

A major health issue within communities of color in the U.S. is the lack of access to fresh, and unprocessed foods. The consumption of highly processed foods in Latino and/or Black communities is linked to higher rates of health issues such as diabetes, heart disease, and even cancer.

Racial and ethnic minorities in the United States are impacted by larger patterns of inequality, which are intricately linked to these differences in health coverage and access. Even though the Affordable Care Act (ACA) improved health coverage, there are still large disparities, especially among Black, Hispanic, Native Hawaiian/Pacific Islander (NHPI), and American Indian/Alaska Native (AIAN) people who are not old. These groups are more likely than their White counterparts to be uninsured, according to data from recent years. For instance, the uninsured rate for white Americans is 7% as of 2022, while it is still a startlingly high 18% and 19% for non-elderly Hispanic and Asian Americans, respectively.

These difficulties underscore the pressing need for focused policy changes to address the wider social determinants of health that disproportionately impact minority groups in the United States, in addition to health insurance coverage.

Although Black Hispanics are often overlooked or dichotomized as either “black” or “Hispanic” in the United States of America, Black Hispanic writers often reflect upon their racialized experience in their works. The most commonly used term in literature to speak of this ambiguity and multilayered hybridity at the heart of Latino/Latina identity and culture is miscegenation. This “mestizaje” depicts the multi-faceted racial and cultural identity that characterize Black Hispanics and highlights that each individual Black Hispanic has a unique experience within a broader racial and ethnic range.

== Civil rights ==
Data from a 2021 survey by the Pew Research Center shows that Hispanic people in the US with darker skin color are more likely to face incidents of discrimination than those with lighter skin. The survey asked participants to self-identify their skin color, and then asked series of questions about the kinds of discrimination they faced. When asked whether they faced at least one instance of discrimination in the last year, 64% of darker-skinned Hispanic adults responded that they had. When asked the same question, 54% of lighter-skinned Hispanic adults responded the same. As for the specific discrimination experienced:

- 42% of darker-skinned Hispanic people said they were treated as if they were not smart, compared to 34% of those with lighter skin.
- 42% of darker-skinned Hispanic people said they experienced discrimination by someone who is non-Hispanic, compared to 29% of those with lighter skin.
- 41% of darker-skinned Hispanic people said they experienced discrimination by someone who is Hispanic, compared to 25% of those with lighter skin.
- 33% of darker-skinned Hispanic people were criticized for speaking Spanish, compared to 22% of those with lighter skin.
- 32% of darker-skinned Hispanic people were told to go back to their country compared to 20% of those with lighter skin.
- 27% of darker-skinned Hispanic people feared for their personal safety, compared to 20% of those with lighter skin.
- 31% of darker-skinned Hispanic people were called offensive names, compared to 18% of those with lighter skin.
- 16% of darker-skinned Hispanics were unfairly stopped by police, compared to 8% of those with lighter skin.

In Latin America, Black Hispanics have historically had similar discrimination issues as African Americans in the US, including Cuba, where racial discrimination against Afro-Cubans continues to be a major human right issue for the Cuban government, even resulting in riots in Central Havana, a mostly black neighborhood in the capital. In Mexico, racism against black Mexicans has been also an often ignored issue, and it wasn’t until 2020 that an option appeared on the national census allowing black Mexicans to self-identify, even though polls had shown that about 2.5 million Mexicans identify as black. Racism in Puerto Rico has also been well-documented, and according to Black Perspectives, “in Puerto Rico, much like in the rest of Latin America, anti-Black racism is embedded in the very denial of its existence by the state and society.” Yet despite issues of Anti-Blackness within the Puerto Rican community there is also a large sense of cultural syncretism, and shared experience between the Puerto Rican community and African American community. An example of this would be the Puerto Rican Young Lords movement which started in Chicago and was heavily influenced by the Black Panther Party, out of a need for representation of inner city Puerto Rican/Latino communities. The two groups often collaborated, forming the “Rainbow Coalition” in order to campaign for civil rights such as proper sanitation, Lead paint detection, free meals for children, and health care services in black, and brown communities across the United States. Brazil's racism towards its near majority Afro-Brazilian population also has a long, well-documented history, as well as its “whitening ideology” of the 1930s, when the government encouraged European migration to successfully shift the country’s racial make-up to a white majority. In Honduras, racism against Afro-Hondurans has also received international attention as the country struggles with discrimination issues. Racism in Argentina, which has a 97 percent white population, is also well-documented and “persists against indigenous peoples, immigrants, Afro-Argentines, mestizo Argentines, Jews and Arabs.” Even in countries with majority black Hispanic populations, such as the Dominican Republic, the case of racism against “darker” skinned Dominicans and neighboring Haitians is an issue.

A Pew Research report published in May 2022 surveyed Afro-Latinos. Findings included 61% of Afro-Latinos saying they were discriminated against, including be more likely than other Latinos in being stopped by police, criticized by others for speaking Spanish in a public place, and people around them thinking they are “not smart.”

Jessica Lavariega Monforti and Gabriel R. Sanchez (2010), as part of their larger research article, wanted to understand if being Black has an impact on if Latinos feel discriminated against by other Latinos. Using “2002 Kaiser/Pew Latino National Survey” data, they show that there was a p-value of less than 0.05 for the category “Black racial identification;” however, there is no statistical significance for this category when the data was separated by “national-origin”. This signifies that being Black is a factor when looking at the Latino population as a unit, but the same could not be said when the population was divided by “national-origin”. With regard to “national-origin”, for that there is a category for “Central/South American”, so some identities were grouped; though, not all Latin American nationalities were covered in the original dataset either.

== In media ==
Since the early days of the movie industry in the United States of America, when Black Hispanic actors were given roles, they would usually be cast as African Americans.

Critics accuse U.S. Hispanic media, including Latin American media, of overlooking black Hispanic and Latino Americans and black Latin Americans in the telenovelas, mostly stereotyping them as impoverished people. According to Frederick Aldama’s book Latinx TV in the Twentieth Century, Latinos are the most underrepresented group of people portrayed in media in the United States. Latinos make up 19% of the population in the United States but are barely making 3% of media portrayed in the United States.

In an article released in 2022 by Daphnie Sicre by The University of Alabama press titled “Being Black and Latinx in Theatre Today,” she interviews ten Afro-Latinx performers to conduct a research study on Afro-Latinx in theatre industry. The 10 performers were cast for the play Platanos y Collard Greens. After interviewing each of them, Sicre noticed there was a common theme amongst the group. Majority of the Afro Latinx cast members swayed more to being ethnically ambiguous. This is when someone’s racial background isn't able to be identified right away because it doesn’t fit with one’s physical features. The research noted that because of systemic racism, some cast members were given better roles than their peers. Those who were darker skinned would pass as Black and weren’t given the same opportunities as other cast members that were light skinned actors, which were given more roles.

Juano Hernandez was an Afro-Puerto Rican actor and writer who became notable for his role as Lucas Beauchamp in the 1949 film Intruder in the Dust, as an impoverished Black farmer who was falsely accused of killing a white man in Mississippi. Juano Hernandez received a Golden Globe nomination for his performance in 1951. Following the film, it would lead fellow actors and audience members to assume Juano Hernandez was an African American man and discredited his Puerto Rican nationality. Following this film, he would proceed to portray roles of African American men and strayed him away from Hispanic media, despite being Afro-Latino.

Miles Morales, created in 2011 as one of the incarnations of Spider-Man and the protagonist of the run of Spider-Man in the Ultimate Universe of Marvel and the animated trilogy of Spider-Man: Into the Spider-Verse, Spider-Man: Across the Spider-Verse, and Spider-Man: Beyond the Spider-Verse, is an Afro-Latino American, born in Brooklyn to a Puerto Rican mother and an African American father.

In January 2020, The Owl House began airing on the Disney Channel. The series would feature Luz Noceda, an Afro-Latino character whose parents are from the Dominican Republic, and was based on a friend of the show’s creator, Dana Terrace, Luz Batista, who insisted that the character be Dominican like her.

In February 2021, LATV Networks, LLC premiered Blacktinidad, the first national TV series focusing specifically on the black Latin experience.

== See also ==
- Afro-Cubans
- Afro–Puerto Ricans
- Afro-Dominicans
- Afro-Panamanians
- Afro-Colombians
- Afro-Hondurans
- Garifuna – a people of mixed free African and indigenous American
- Afro-Caribbean people
- Afro–Latin Americans
- Afro-Brazilians
- Haitian Americans
- Afro-Haitians
- African Americans
- Equatoguinean Americans
- List of Afro-Latinos
- List of Hispanic and Latino Americans
- White Hispanic and Latino Americans
- Asian Hispanic and Latino Americans
- Blaxican
- Oba Ifa Morote
- Afro-Mexicans
