= Blaxican =

Americans who are both Black and Mexican American

Blaxican or Afro-Chicano
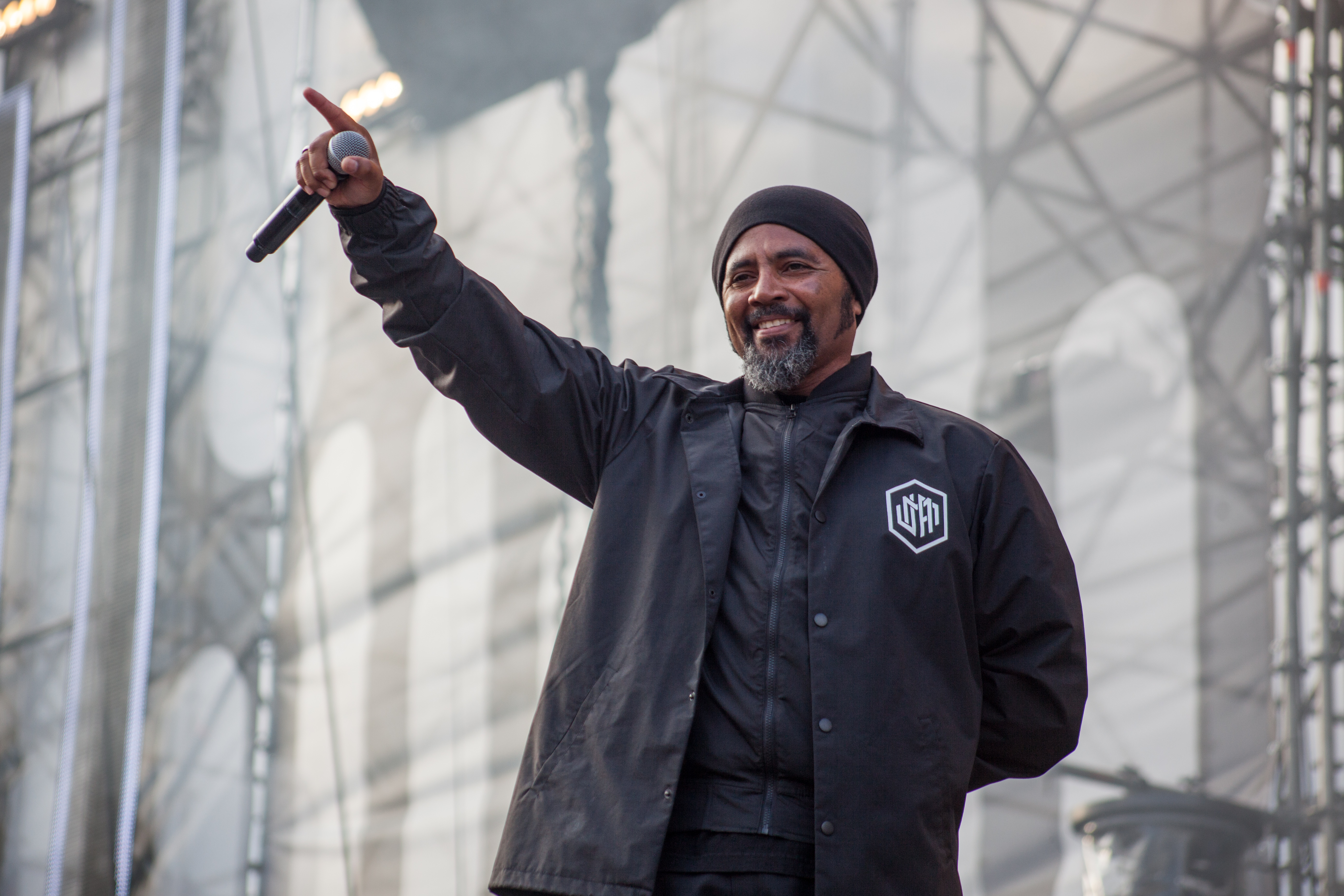
- Artist Kemo The Blaxican (2019)

Total population
- ~42,000 (Los Angeles County)

Regions with significant populations
- California, Texas, Arizona, New Mexico, Georgia, Nevada

Languages
- American English, African-American Vernacular English, Mexican Spanish, Spanglish

Related ethnic groups
- African Americans, Mexican Americans, Afro-Mexicans, Afro-Latin Americans

Blaxicans are Americans who are of both Black and Mexican American descent. Some may prefer to identify as Afro-Chicano or Black Chicana/o and embrace Chicano identity, culture, and political consciousness. Most Blaxicans have origins in working class community interactions between African Americans and Mexican Americans. Los Angeles has been cited as the hub for Blaxican culture. In 2010, it was recorded that 42,000 people in Los Angeles County identified as both Black and Latino, most of whom are believed to be both Black and Mexican American.

Many Blaxicans experience erasure due to racial constructs in the United States, such as the "one-drop rule," high levels of anti-Blackness in Mexican American communities, as well as prejudices and rejection within Black American communities. In both communities, their authenticity is frequently policed. Scholars describe Blaxicans as "dual minorities" because of their origins from two communities which have historically been socially, politically, and economically disadvantaged and targeted under white supremacy.

== History ==
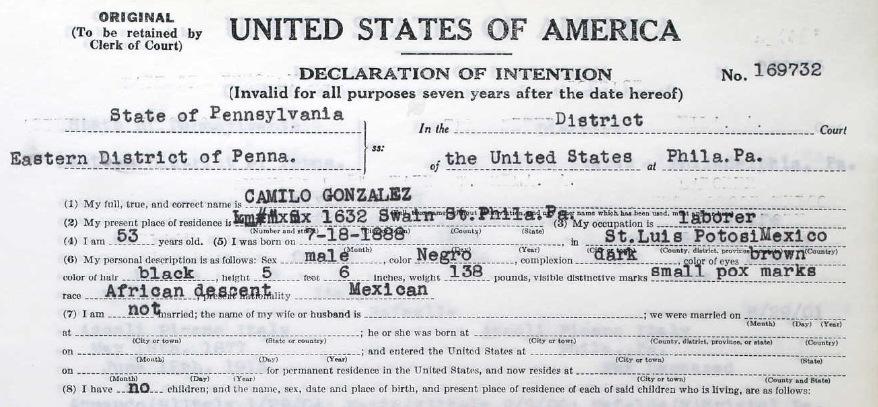
A 1942 Declaration of Intention of naturalization for Camilo Gonzales, an Afro-Mexican immigrant. Gonzales is listed as "Negro" by color, "dark" by complexion, "African descent" by race, and "Mexican" by nationality.

While Blaxican experiences have only recently gained visibility, scholars trace the origins of Black Mexican Americans in the United States to the founding of Pueblo de Los Ángeles in 1781, where it was recorded that 26 of the 44 Mexicans who founded the pueblo were Afro-Mexicans or Mexicans of African descent.

In the 1960s and 1970s, Black and Chicano communities engaged in close political interactions "around civil rights struggles, union activism, and demographic changes," especially during the Black Power and Chicano Movement struggles for liberation. Tensions between Blacks and Chicanos also "increased [because of] competition for scarce resources," which has been described as "too often positioning workers of different races in opposition to each other."

Scholars have noted that there have been historical tensions between Mexican American and African American communities that have caused challenges for people of both experiences. Blaxican scholar Walter Thompson-Hernandez states that "Blacks and Mexicans are two of the most aggrieved groups in our nation's history" and notes that anti-black racism among Mexican Americans is a major cause of tension and division between both communities.

In the 1980s and 1990s there was an influx of Mexican immigrants moving into Black neighborhoods in South Los Angeles, which caused an increase in the Blaxican population.

== Identity ==
Scholar Rebecca Romo states that "Blaxican identities encompass tolerance for contradictions, ambiguity, and the juggling of two cultures" and compares this experience to Gloria E. Anzaldúa's idea of mestiza consciousness. Blaxicans on the East Coast of the United States are often mistaken for being Puerto Rican, Cuban, or Dominican because of the comparatively lower amount of Mexican Americans in that region.

=== Authenticity ===
Blaxicans are often judged as not authentically Mexican if they appear to be mixed and Black or only appear to be Black and if they do not speak Spanish. The promotion of mestizaje in Mexico, or the idea that all Mexican people are mestizos, has been cited as a reason for this assumption. Another contributor to this idea was the assertion during the Chicano Movement of a distinctly Brown race. This has led to Blaxicans being assumed to know nothing of Mexican American culture because there is an assumption that if they look Black they also cannot be Mexican American.

Similarly, Blaxicans are often judged as not authentically Black. Scholar Rebecca Romo states that "for African Americans, the stakes are higher when determining racial/ethnic authenticity" because of the ways in which "Black people are relegated to the lowest position on the racial structure and authenticity is equated to loyalty to Black liberation." Some markers of authenticity cited by Blaxicans include "dress, talk, hip-hop culture, knowledge of African American history, dancing, 'kinky,' 'afro,' or 'crinkly' hair, darker skin, and working-class status."

=== Gender ===
Blaxican women reported experiencing more prejudice than Blaxican men in regard to policing their identity. In a study on Blaxican identity, Rebecca Romo found that "Blaxican women reported being exoticized by men in general, and by Mexican and African American men specifically." For Mexican heterosexual men, an awareness of Blaxican women being "more than Black made Blaxican women acceptable to pursue." Romo compares this to the idea of the mulata in Mexico, who "is an icon of sexual desire and a symbol for the danger of racial contamination through miscegenation."

Blaxican men reported feeling they had "to conform to masculine expectations of Mexican men in the form of machismo."

== Culture ==
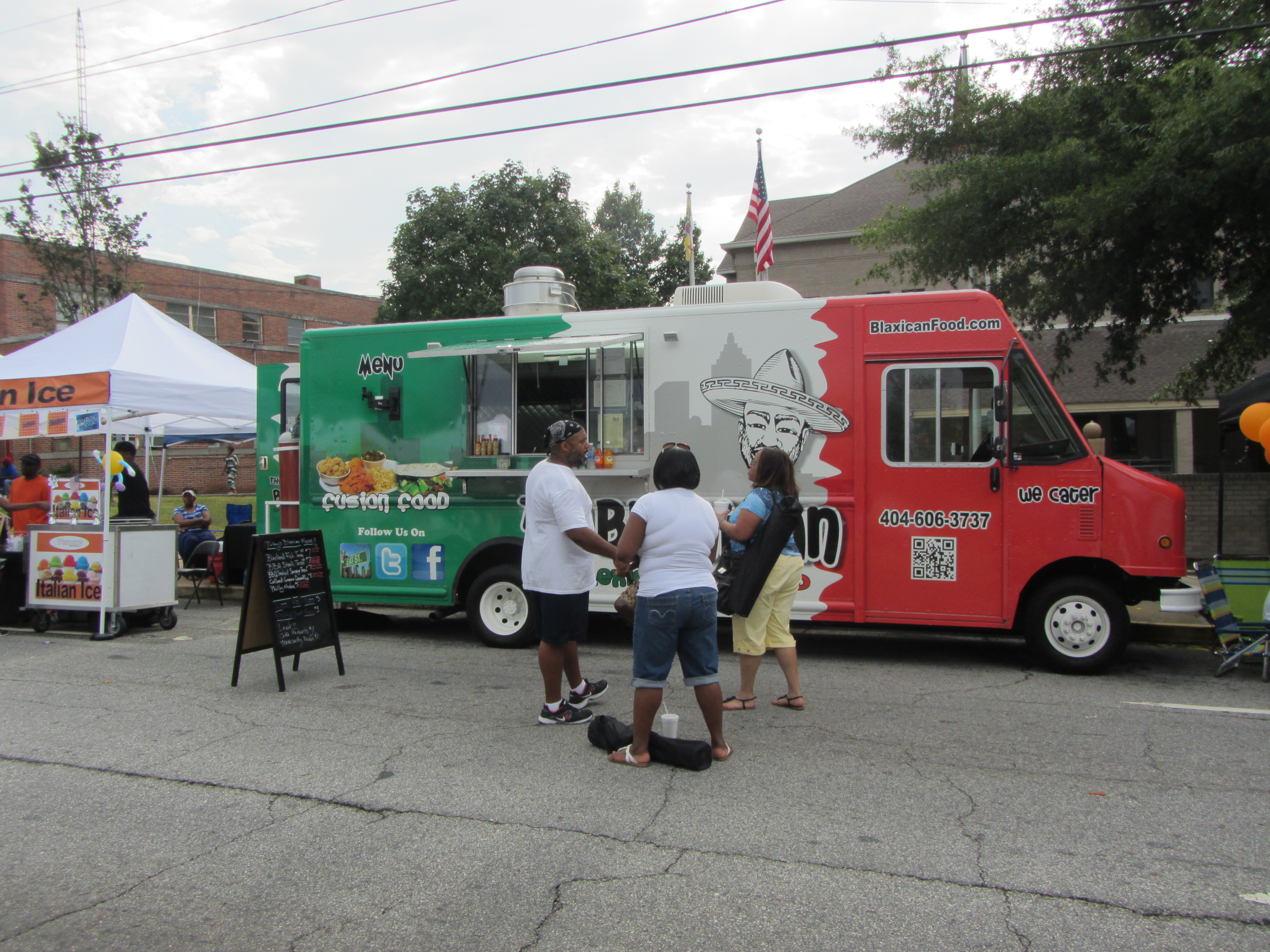
Will Turner and The Blaxican food truck in Atlanta, Georgia (2012)

Blaxican culture is a hybrid culture that combines elements from African American or Black and Mexican American or Chicano cultures. Photographer Walter Thompson-Hernandez covers the Blaxican experience in his Blaxicans of L.A. project. Poets include Ariana Brown and Natasha Carrizosa. Musician and painter Ras Levy has also been noted.

Recording artists include Miguel, Kemo The Blaxican of Delinquent Habits, and Afro-Chicano rapper Choosey. Kemo The Blaxican states that Black and Latino hip hop artists have been coexisting since the days of early hip-hop. Choosey states "there’s a stigma that Black and Mexican cultures don’t get along, but I wanted to show the beauty in being a product of both.”

The Blaxican is a food truck owned by Will Turner in Atlanta, Georgia that serves "Mexican Soul Food" and has been operating for over ten years. A brick and mortar location opened up in 2016, but closed under economic pressure from the coronavirus outbreak in 2020. The food truck was saved after a campaign from Alexis Akarolo and Ze Clark, who started a fund to help Black businesses during the pandemic.

== See also ==
- African Americans
- Black Hispanic and Latino Americans
