= Juan García Pizarro =

Black Spanish conquistador

- Born: 1495; Jaraicejo, Spain
- Died: Unknown; Spain
- Military career
- Allegiance: Spanish Empire
- Service years: 1529–1537
- Conflicts: Battle of Cajamarca

Juan García Pizarro (1495-unknown) was an Afro-Spanish conquistador. He participated in the conquest of the Inca Empire in the entourage of Francisco Pizarro, from whom he received his second surname, before returning to Spain as a wealthy man. Along with Miguel Ruiz, García was the most known of the numerous African conquistadors serving in Peru.

== Early life ==
He was born as a free black man in 1495 in Jaraicejo, not far from Pizarro's own home city of Trujillo, Extremadura. His parents remain unknown. There is the belief that they were an interracial couple, although García's comrades fail to distinguish in their chronicles whether he was black or mulatto, in the case they knew it. He joined Pizarro when the Extremaduran conquistador gathered men for his expedition in 1529, leaving behind a wife and two daughters in order to embark.

== Conquest of the Inca Empire ==
García and the mulatto Miguel Ruiz were the only two black members of Pizarro's crew named in the sources, although according to chronicler Pedro Cieza de León, black conquistadors amounted to a large portion of the 168 men of the expedition. He served in multiple capacities, like soldier, crier, bagpiper and accountant, the last role making him responsible for weighing and keeping count of the gold and silver gained in the conquest. In 1533, he participated in the Battle of Cajamarca, which granted him a part of the captured Emperor Atahualpa's rich rescue. It's recorded he used part of the money to buy from another conquistador a Nicaraguan woman who had been enslaved before royal decrees banned native slavery. He later was present in the taking of Cusco, shortly before the death of his colleague Ruiz.

From 1525 to 1536, he lived in Cusco, where he had an Afro-Mestiza daughter with an Inca woman, before moving with all of them to Lima. By this point, the Spanish army in Peru featured more black members than ever. Aside from Pizarro obtaining license in 1529 to import African slaves, his army had received black conquistadors like Juan Valiente and 200 soldiers brought by Pedro de Alvarado, and 200 more arrived in 1534 as reinforcements against the revolt of Manco Inca. Shortly after, García returned to Spain with his family and wealth, becoming one of the few conquistadors who decided and managed to return to enjoy his gains in Spain. The rest of his life remains unknown, although by 1545 he was still alive, lived in Jaraicejo and called himself Juan García Pizarro.
