= Juan Garrido =

African conquistador in the service of Spain (1480–c. 1550)

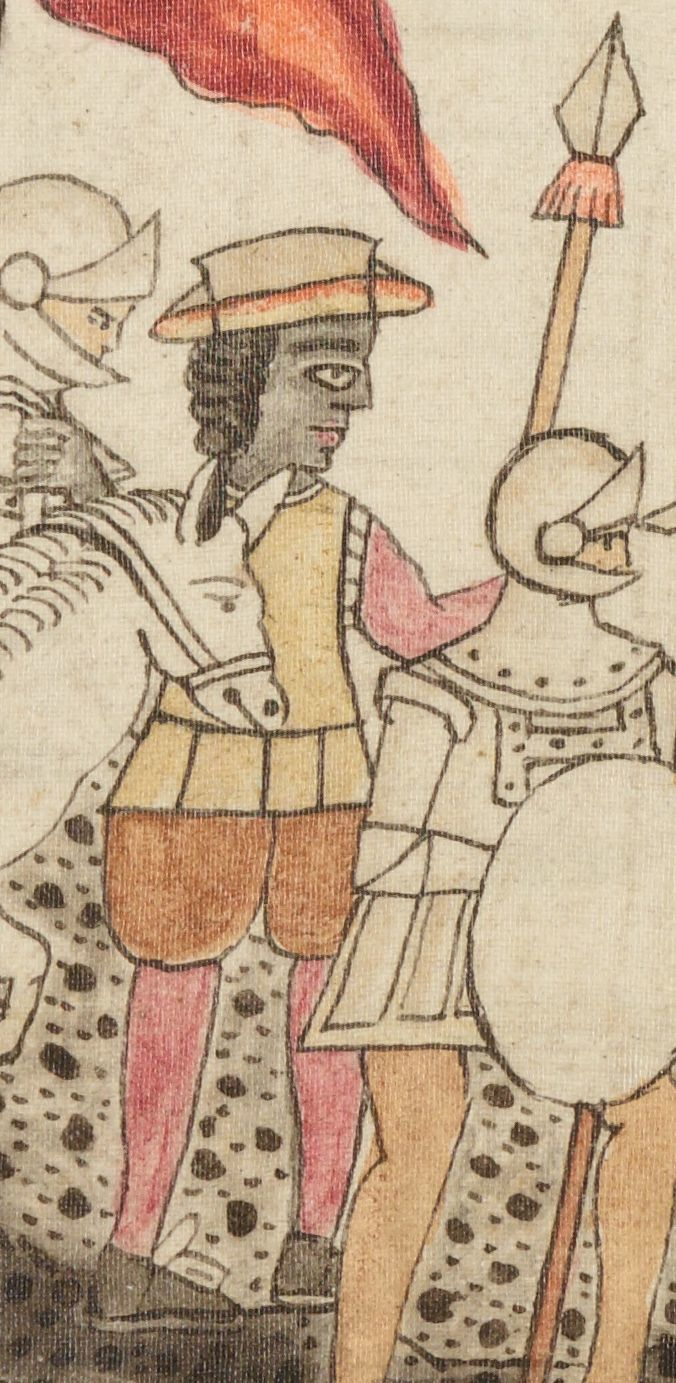
- African auxiliary in the Codex Azcatitlan, possibly Garrido himself.
- Born: c. 1480; Kingdom of Kongo
- Died: 1550 (aged 69–70); New Spain, Spanish Empire
- Occupation: Conquistador
- Employer: Hernan Cortés

Juan Garrido (c. 1480 – c. 1550) was an Afro-Spanish conquistador of Kongo origin. Born in the Kingdom of Kongo in West Central Africa, he went to Portugal as a young man. In converting to Catholicism, he chose the Spanish name Juan Garrido ("John Handsome"). He is the first known free African to arrive in North America.

He participated in the Spanish conquests of Puerto Rico by Juan Ponce de León, Cuba by Diego Velázquez and the expeditions to Florida by Ponce de León. By 1519, Garrido had joined Cortes's forces and invaded present-day Mexico, participating in the siege of Tenochtitlan. He married and settled in Mexico City, where he was the first known farmer to have sowed wheat in America. He continued to serve with Spanish forces for more than 30 years, including expeditions to western Mexico and to the Pacific.

Garrido is considered the prime example of black conquistador, although in reality the presence of Africans and mulattos in the Hispanic ranks had already become a widespread occurrence after the first decade of the 16th century. Other examples of black conquistadors included Beatriz de Palacios, Juan Valiente, Juan García Pizarro, Juan de Villanueva, Pedro Fulupo and Antonio Pérez. The presence of black people was shocking to Mesoamericans, who called them teucacatzactli ("black deities") in Nahuatl.

== Early life ==
Garrido was born in the Kingdom of Kongo situated in West Central Africa in about 1480, and came to Portugal as a youth. Crossing the Atlantic and arriving in Santo Domingo, Hispaniola, in 1502 or 1503, Garrido was among the earliest Africans to reach the Americas. He was one of numerous Africans who had joined expeditions from Seville to the Americas. From the beginning of Spanish presence in the Americas, Africans participated as voluntary expeditionaries, conquistadors, and auxiliaries. He gained experience in deployments around the Caribbean, among them the conquest of Puerto Rico by Juan Ponce de León, Cuba by Diego Velázquez in 1508, as well as the expeditions of Ponce de León in search of gold in Florida in 1513.

== Conquest of the Aztec Empire ==
Garrido formed part of the expedition of Hernán Cortés in 1519. He might have been associated to conquistador Pedro Garrido, as it was common for Spaniards to give their surnames to their black auxiliars, free or slave. Alternatively, he could have been part of the entourage of conquistador Juan Núñez Sedaño, who according to chronicler Bernal Díaz del Castillo brought a black man in his entourage due to his wealth. Díaz del Castillo states black slaves or servants were still rare, leading some historians to the belief that Sedaño's retainer could not be other than Garrido, although in reality Diego Durán and Cortés' own writings talk about a plural of blacks in the expedition.

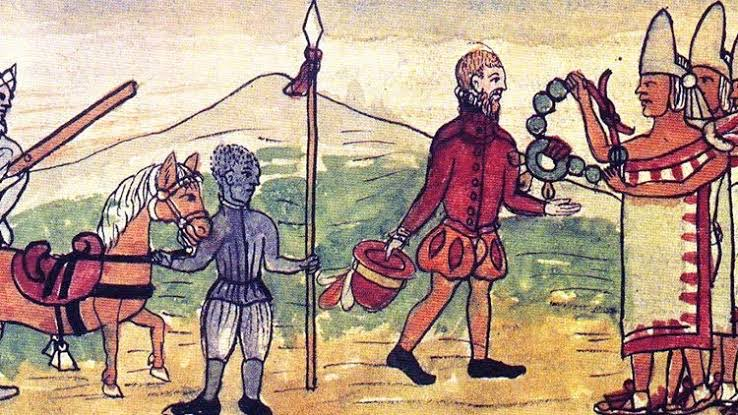
Depiction of an African conquistador in Cortés' entourage, possibly either Juan Garrido or Juan Cortés.

Others authors believe that Garrido actually arrived later with the contingent of Pánfilo de Narváez, only joining Cortés after Narváez's troops abandoned him after the Battle of Cempoala. African presence in this second expedition seems to have been high. At least two additional black conquistadors arrived with Narváez: the Portuguese Sebastián de Évora, who would discover the Évora or Mocorito river in Sinaloa, and the Spanish conquistadora Beatriz de Palacios, wife to the white soldier Pedro de Escobar. The expedition also included an African jester, Guidela, and the slave Francisco de Eguía, who accidentally introduced smallpox in Mesoamerica after falling ill in Cempoala.

Although it is not widely agreed, historian Ricardo Alegría proposed that Garrido might be actually another name for Juan Cortés, a black slave owned by Hernán Cortés himself who gets mentioned in the chronicles of Antonio de Herrera y Tordesillas and Francisco Cervantes de Salazar. In his relevant instance in the chronicle, after the Spanish and Tlaxcaltecs retreat from the la Noche Triste, a lone Aztec warrior challenged them on the road to a singles combat, leading Juan Cortés and conquistador Alonso de Moguer to come out of the ranks to answer the challenge. The duels never took place, as the Aztec fled, possibly attempting an ambush.

By 1520, the expedition achieved the Fall of Tenochtitlan. In 1520, Garrido built a chapel to commemorate the many Spanish killed in battle that year by the Aztecs. It now stands as the Church of San Hipólito. Garrido married and settled in Mexico City, where he and his wife had three children. Matthew Restall credits him with the first harvesting of wheat planted in New Spain.

== After the conquest ==
Garrido and other blacks were also part of expeditions to Michoacán in the 1520s. Nuño de Guzmán swept through that region in 1529–30 with the aid of black auxiliaries.

In 1538, hoping for some rewards or benefits for his 30 years of service as a conquistador, Garrido provided following testimony to the King of Spain, requesting a royal pension:

"I, Juan Garrido, black in color, resident of this city [Mexico], appear before Your Mercy and state that I am in need of providing evidence to the perpetuity of the king [a perpetuidad rey], a report on how I served Your Majesty in the conquest and pacification of this New Spain, from the time when the Marqués del Valle [Cortés] entered it; and in his company I was present at all the invasions and conquests and pacifications which were carried out, always with the said Marqués, all of which I did at my own expense without being given either salary or allotment of natives [repartimiento de indios] or anything else. As I am married and a resident of this city, where I have always lived; and also as I went with the Marqués del Valle to discover the islands which are in that part of the southern sea [the Pacific] where there was much hunger and privation; and also as I went to discover and pacify the islands of San Juan de Buriquén es de Puerto Rico; and also as I went on the pacification and conquest of the island of Cuba with the adelantado Diego Velázquez; in all these ways for thirty years have I served and continue to serve Your Majesty—for these reasons stated above do I petition Your Mercy. And also because I was the first to have the inspiration to sow wheat here in New Spain and to see if it took; I did this and experimented at my own expense."

Garrido's letter had the desired effect, as he was compensated for his services with land and money.

== See also ==
- Afro-Puerto Ricans
- Afro-Spaniard
- Juan Valiente
- Malgarida
