= Gastón Baquero =

Cuban poet and writer

Gastón Baquero (1916–1997) was a Cuban poet and writer.

== Works ==
- Poemas (La Habana, 1942)
- Saúl sobre su espada (La Habana, 1942)
- Ensayos' (La Habana, 1948)
- Poemas escritos en España (Madrid, 1960)
- Escritores hispanoamericanos de hoy' (Madrid, 1961)
- Memorial de un testigo (Madrid, 1966)
- La evolución del marxismo en Hispanoamérica (Madrid, 1966)
- Darío, Cernuda y otros temas poéticos (Madrid, 1969)
- Magias e invenciones (Madrid, 1984), poesías completas hasta la fecha, a cargo del poeta boliviano Pedro Shimose
- Poemas invisibles (Madrid, 1991)
- Indios, blancos y negros en el caldero de América (Madrid, 1991)
- Acercamiento a Dulce María Loynaz (Madrid, 1993)
- La fuente inagotable (Valencia, 1995).*Poesía (Salamanca, 1995)
- Ensayo (Salamanca, 1995)
- Poesía completa (Editorial Verbum, 1998), recogida por el poeta y editor cubano Pío Serrano
- The Angel of Rain. Poems by Gastón Baquero (Eastern Washington University Press, 2006), translated by Greg Simon and Steven F. White
- Geografía literaria. 1945–1996: crónicas y ensayos (Madrid, 2007), edición del escritor y periodista cubano-británico Alberto Díaz-Díaz
