= Ariana Brown =

American spoken word poet from Texas

- Born: San Antonio, Texas
- Education: BA,University of Texas at Austin; MFA, University of Pittsburgh
- Known for: Poetry, Poetry Slams
- Awards: Academy of American Poets Prize
- Website: www.arianabrown.com

Ariana Brown (born in San Antonio, Texas) is an American spoken word poet. In 2014, she was part of a winning team at the national collegiate poetry slam. Ariana Brown has won the “Best Poet” award twice at the same event.

She is also a two-time recipient of the Academy of American Poets Prize. She published her debut poetry chapbook, Sana Sana, with Game Over Books in early 2020.

== Early life and education ==
Brown was born in San Antonio, Texas. Her father was a Black American and her mother is Mexican-American. Brown identifies as a Black Mexican American person. Growing up, Brown struggled to find representations of herself in literature, so she decided to write poetry for young women who experienced similar struggles of identity and representation. She was also inspired by Black movement leaders, including Malcolm X. In 2011, she was a part of her first poetry slam team called the Spitshine Slam which she was in charge of cofounding and they performed at Brave New Voices. In 2014 they ranked first in College Unions Poetry Slam International (CUPSI).

Brown received her Bachelor's of Arts degree in African Diaspora Studies and Mexican American Studies from the University of Texas at Austin. She also received a Master of Fine Arts in poetry at the University of Pittsburgh and is working on a poetry manuscript about her life, the formation of a racial identity, cultural politics, and authenticity among other themes.

== Work ==
Brown has continued to participate in poetry slams, has performed her poetry across the United States, and often holds poetry workshops focused on writing poetry that heals. She's well known for performing in multiple venues such as the San Antonio Guadalupe Theater, Tucson Poetry Festival, and the San Francisco Opera Theatre.

Brown writes poetry to uplift Black people and pay homage to her ancestors and the history of her people. She wants to inspire and uplift disempowered communities through her poetry. She also uses her poetry to validate Black girl rage. She writes about the anti-Blackness within the Mexican community and advocates for Black Chicanx individuals. Brown has been dubbed a "part-time curandera" because her poetry deals with healing issues of race, ethnicity, gender, class, and sexual orientation. She weaves contemporary issues and tensions into her poetry.

In 2021, Brown's debut poetry collection “We Are Owed” was published, after six years of work. Jonathan Cortez, a Ph.D. recipient from the Department of American Studies at Brown University, describes the book's title as a “call to action, a demand, a recognition, a reparation, a reorientation, and a reclamation”. Ali Black, a writer and poet based in Cleveland, Ohio, describes this collection as untraditional, as it combines poems, epigraphs, and “Brown’s college course notes from 2014 and 2015,” giving it the feel of both a diary and a history book. In this collection, Brown explores the intersection of queer Black identity while navigating Mexican-American spaces. Brown's poems also serve to reclaim and highlight the erased history of key Black historical figures, including Gaspar Yanga and Estevanico. Brown has expressed frustration for having to rely on YouTube videos to learn about Black history. For that reason, she dedicates several poems to Yanga, including "Letter to Yanga, from Six-Year-Old Ariana", where she requests that Yanga send her an image of himself. She eventually comes to terms with her inability to "find an image of Yanga online" concluding "instead, I try harder to love my own face, nose, lips, hair". She discusses the misrepresentation of Black Chicanx individuals in popular culture, such as in the game Lotería. Brown also reflects on her study abroad experience in Mexico City, where she was the only Black person on the trip. In Mexico City, she felt a sense of alienation from Latino culture due to the marginalization of Afro-Latinos and her difficulty engaging with the culture. She highlights “the erasure of Blackness in Mexico within Mexicanidad” and addresses the violence faced by Afro-Latinos, including isolation and anti-Black sentiments.

In 2020, Ariana Brown published her poetry chapbook, Sana Sana. This is a collection of poems is an exploration of her lived experience as a Black woman, navigating queerness, love, life, and womanhood. Her book is an homage to the saying “Sana Sana, colita de rana, si no sana hoy, sana en la mañana.” Brown expresses that this book is a reflection of her writing towards healing.

Her work has been featured in PBS, Huffington Post, Blavity, For Harriet, and Remezcla among others.

In 2024, her work was included in Xican-a.o.x. Body, a comprehensive group exhibition on the experiences and contributions by Chicano artists in contemporary culture. The show was on view at the Cheech Marin Center for Chicano Art & Culture at the Riverside Art Museum, California, and later at the Pérez Art Museum Miami, Florida.

== Personal life ==
Ariana Brown, a Black Mexican American poet, has openly discussed her complex relationship with identity and representation in her personal life. Born and raised in San Antonio, Texas, she is the daughter of an African American father and a Mexican American mother. Her experiences as a queer, Blaxican woman have heavily influenced her work, as she uses poetry to explore themes of racial identity, cultural politics, and the erasure of Blackness within Mexican communities.

Brown's deep interest in lineage and history stems from her father dying before she was born, leading her to reflect on her heritage and the significance of ancestral connections. This focus on identity is evident in much of her work, including her debut chapbook Sana Sana and her poetry collection We Are Owed. Her poetry often addresses the intersections of race, ethnicity, and gender, and she speaks candidly about the challenges of finding her place in both Black and Latinx communities.

In addition to her literary pursuits, Brown is a part-time curandera, which reflects her focus on healing in her writing. She incorporates themes of emotional and spiritual healing, drawing from her experiences in poetry slams and her evolving understanding of history and identity.

== Honors and awards ==
- Ranked first overall at the College Unions Poetry Slam International (CUPSI)(2014)
- Recipient of the National Association of Latino Arts and Cultures, San Antonio Artist Grant (2019)

== Works ==
- We Are Owed., Grieveland, July 2021.
- Sana Sana (debut poetry chapbook), Game Over Books, January 2020
- LET US BE ENOUGH (debut poetry EP), February 22, 2019
- “quaker blake” Barrelhouse Magazine, December 9, 2018
- “Alternate Memory, or Love Dances Barefoot After the Men Have Disappeared” Barrelhouse Magazine, December 9, 2018
- “Introductions” Scalawag Magazine, October 1, 2018
- “In Defense of Santana’s ‘Maria Maria,’ Featuring Wyclef & the Product G&B” Rattle, January 29, 2018
- “Minute Fathers” Sidekick Lit, Issue Four
- “A Division of Gods” Winter Tangerine, 2017
- “Abuela, de Carrizo Springs” As/Us, September 17, 2017
- “Supremacy” Muzzle, June 2017
- “Nylon, Black, ‘72” BOAAT
- “At the End of the Sword” Neptantla, Issue 3
- “Always, There is Music” African Voices, July 8, 2016
- “Don’t Know Nobody from Ellis Island” Bird’s Thumb, June 2016
- “Invocation” & “Sunday Morning” HEArt Online, April 4, 2016
- “Ossuary” Rattle: Poets Respond, October 25, 2015
