= Joaquín Lenzina =

Friend of José Gervasio Artigad

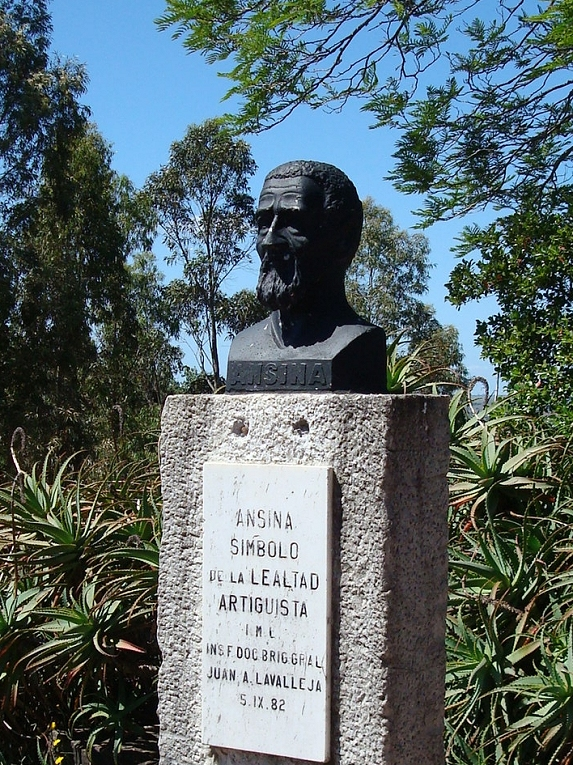
Monument to Ansina in Parque Artigas, Minas

Joaquín Lenzina, commonly known as "El Negro Ansina", accompanied José Gervasio Artigas throughout his life as his most loyal friend.

He was born in Montevideo in about 1760, son of black slaves. He was a waterboy who, still as a child, moved to the countryside where he became a payador, a gaucho wandering minstrel.

He enlisted as a crew member in a fishing boat which turned out to be a pirate ship. Upon discovering this, he fled to the Brazilian coast where he was captured and enslaved.

He was bought by Artigas, who liberated him immediately, establishing a deep lifelong friendship between them. He participated in various battles alongside Artigas, eventually accompanying Artigas when he was exiled to Paraguay.

After the death of Artigas, Manuel Antonio Ledesma learned of the solitude in which Ansina lived and welcomed him to his home until his death in 1860. Unfortunately, due to the destruction caused by the war of Paraguay, his remains have not been found.

== The use of "Negro" (spanish for "Black") in Uruguayan society ==
Among Uruguayans, the term "negro" is used as an endearment, independent of the skin color. A Uruguayan may address a friend or family member by "mi negro" or "negrito, negrita", and it is considered an affectionate injunction, associated with friendship and loyalty. Lenzina is thus mostly known by the Uruguayan people as "Negro Ansina", which is the name Artigas used to refer to him.
