= Teresa Chikaba =

Ghanaian nun

Venerable Teresa Juliana of Saint Dominic OP
- Born: Tshikaba (or Chikaba) c. 1676; West Africa (prob. Guinea)
- Died: 6 December 1748; Salamanca, Spain

Teresa Chikaba, OP (Ewe: Chicaba or Chicava; c. 1676 – 6 December 1748) was an African princess captured by Spanish traders and brought to Spain, where she was enslaved. She later gained freedom and became a Dominican. A beatification process for her was opened in 1997, and she was titled venerable.

== Biography ==
An account written by a priest in 1752, shortly after her death, is the primary source for her biography, based on his interviews with her and on her writings (no longer extant). Kidnapped at the age of nine, Teresa de Santo Domingo could recall only a few details of her life prior to enslavement.

She was born in the territory known to seventeenth- and eighteenth-century Portuguese navigators as La Mina Baja del Oro, the parts of West Africa that extends through present-day eastern Ghana, Togo, Benin, and western Nigeria. She was named Chicaba. The names of her parents suggest that her people were Ewe.

Chicaba was kidnapped by Spanish sailors and sold into slavery. She was sent to the island of São Tomé, where she was baptized and given the name Teresa. During her childhood she was exported to Spain. Perhaps her youth, her illness during the arduous first leg of the Middle Passage, or maybe her enslavers’ belief that the gold bangles (manacles) she wore were signs of her exalted social status convinced the traders that she might bring a special profit in the Spanish market.

Juliana Teresa Portocarrero y Meneses, then Duchess of Arcos and later the third wife of the 2nd Marquess of Mancera, purchased Chicaba. The marquess had served as viceroy of New Spain and, during his tenure there, had been a protector of the writer and nun Juana Inés de la Cruz.

As a member of the retinue of this religious aristocratic household, the young slave habituated herself to the piousness of her mistress and developed a sense of spirituality that in time became her key to freedom. In addition, while with the marchioness, Chicaba must have acquired the intellectual preparation that enabled her to undertake the customary projects of religious women of the period.

In accordance with the behest of her owner, who died in 1703, Teresa was free to enter the Dominican monastery of Saint Mary Magdalene in Salamanca, known as "La Penitencia". This monastery (as often happened in other monasteries, not only in Spain) admitted, next to the community of the Dominican nuns, the presence of some lay-women, who chose to devote themselves to a life of penitence and prayer, but they did not make vows as nuns. She traveled to this monastery, the only one to accept the black woman after several attempts on her behalf by the members of the household where she had been a slave. She took with her a handsome dowry (more than most nuns entering that community) and expected to be accepted as a member of the community in some official capacity, but was surprised or disappointed when the welcome was not as she expected. She was initially denied by the local bishop, who only granted her permission to work as a maid for the religious community. Some years later, he relented and she was allowed to make vows as a tertiary, not as a nun.

Over time, Teresa gained recognition as a healer and a sister with prodigious religious gifts. The annuity bequeathed her in the marchioness’ will as well as donations from people who sought her prayers which they believed to be effective, allowed her to gain ascendancy in the monastery among nuns who were only able to make their professions thanks to her financial help with their dowries.

Teresa died on 6 December 1748. She was known for the care she gave to the poor, sick and down-hearted. Her acts of charity, her mystical experiences, and her fame as a healer or miracle worker moved her order soon after her death to commission two portraits of her for purposes of local veneration. At the same time, they initiated the process for her beatification, for which the Theatine priest Paniagua wrote first a funeral oration (Oración fúnebre en las Exequias de la Madre Sor Teresa Juliana de Santo Domingo, de feliz memoria, celebradas en el día nueve de enero en el Convento de Religiosas Dominicas, vulgo de la Penitencia, Salamanca, 1749) and later the full-length hagiography, that has been published also in English. Paniagua's Vida reveals a Catholic piety joined with religious practices retained among some peoples of African descent. Her cause for canonisation is being pursued.

== Beatification process ==
The process of beatification for Chikaba started in 1997, granting her the title Servant of God. The diocesan inquiry on the virtues was opened on 26 February 2001 (date of the first session) and was closed in 2003. On 17 February 2006 the juridical validity of the diocesan inquiry was recognized by the Dicastery of the Causes of Saints.
