= Juan Valiente =

Spanish black conquistador and slave

- Born: Unknown; 1505? Western Africa
- Died: 1553; Tucapel, Viceroyalty of Peru
- Occupation: Conquistador

Juan Valiente (1505? – 1553) was an African-Spanish conquistador and encomendero. He participated in the expeditions of Pedro de Alvarado in present-day Guatemala and Peru and Pedro de Valdivia in Chile. Taken into captivity as a slave in Africa, he was transported to Mexico, where he was purchased by a Spaniard named Alonso Valiente, who returned with him to Spain. As a young man, Valiente negotiated a kind of lease, a permission to join a conquistador's expedition for the chance to earn profits and buy his freedom. He was rewarded for his efforts as a conquistador with an encomienda near the city of Concepción, Chile. There he lived until his death at the Battle of Tucapel.

== Biography ==
Valiente was born with another name in Western Africa. In 1505 he was enslaved and transported to Mexico. He was bought by Alonso Valiente, a Spanish colonist, who had him baptized as Catholic under the name Juan Valiente. When the senior Valiente returned to Spain, he took the young, enslaved Valiente with him as a servant.

In 1533, Valiente signed a contract with his master that, similar to those signed by other enslaved, would-be conquistadors, established a path to manumission. It allowed him to seek new chances as a conquistador and to return in four years with profits from the expedition to share with his master and use to buy his freedom. He sailed to Guatemala and, in 1534, he participated in Pedro de Alvarado's expedition to Peru. In 1535, Valiente joined Alvarado's expedition to Chile and, in 1540, he returned to Chile with Pedro de Valdivia.

Valiente helped found Santiago de Chile in 1541 and was compensated in 1546 with a land grant on the city's outskirts. Four years later, Pedro de Alvarado granted Valiente an encomienda. Valiente became one of five Africans in Chile to have been granted an encomienda. He married Juana de Valdivia, an African who had been formerly enslaved by the governor.

In Chile, Valiente made a certain fortune and could live freely. His master Alonso Valiente had not forgotten his business deal and wanted his money. Juan Valiente had tried to pay but, due to a corrupt official or middleman, he was unable to do so. After extending the payment period, the senior Valiente in 1541 sent a grandson to negotiate a purchase price with the still enslaved Valiente so he could become free. Alonso Valiente insisted on recovering his money, but it was too late; Juan Valiente had died in 1553 and was buried in Araucanía.

== Bibliography ==
- Boyd-Bowmen, Peter. 1969. "Negro Slaves In Early Colonial Mexico." The Americas. 26 (2): 134-151.
- Restall, Mathew. 2000. "Black Conquistadors: Armed Africans in Early Spanish America." The Americas. 57 (2): 171-205.
- Restall, Matthew. 2003. Seven Myths of the Spanish Conquest. New York: Oxford University Press.
