= Pedro de Candia =

Greek-Spanish cartographer and conquistador (1485–1542)

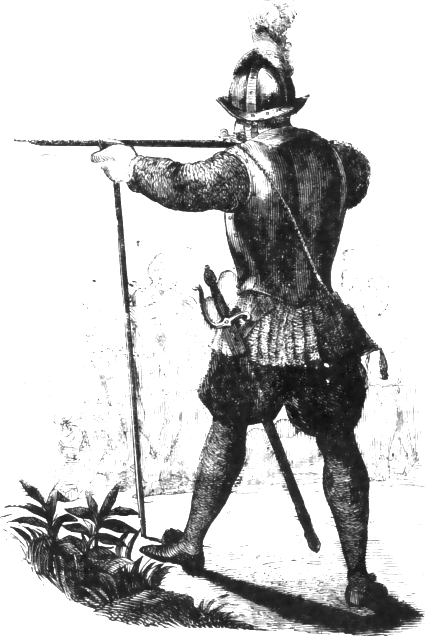
Pedro de Candia

Pedro de Candia (Spanish: [ˈpeðɾo ðe kanˈdi.a]; born Pietro de Candia; 1485–1542) was a Greek explorer and cartographer at the service of the Kingdom of Spain, an officer of the Royal Spanish Navy that under the Spanish Crown became a Conquistador, Commander of the Royal Spanish Fleet of the Southern Sea, Colonial Ordinance of Cusco, and then Mayor of Lima between 1534 and 1535. Specialized in the use of firearms and artillery, he was one of the earliest explorers of Panama and the Pacific coastline of Colombia, and finally participated in the conquest of Peru. He was killed in the Battle of Chupas (Viceroyalty of Peru), on 16 September 1542, by Diego de Almagro II.

== Early life ==
He was born on the island of Crete, which then was part of the Republic of Venice, known as the Kingdom of Candia, in the city of Heraklion (then called Candia, hence his appellation). He left the island through one of his mother's relatives at the service of the Crown of Aragon, who took him to the Kingdoms of Italy. During his period in Italy, he was training to become a Condottiero and trained in the arms; he fought against the Turks and in the Italian campaigns including the Battle of Pavia, as member of Stratioti Greek mercenary units. Then he was transferred to the Iberian peninsula to serve the Catholic Monarchs of Spain, led by Queen Isabel I and King Ferdinand the Catholic. Pedro was eventually married in Spain at Villalpando.

== Conquest of Peru ==
During his first incursion, he went to America with Governor Pedro de los Ríos in 1526 to explore Panama and the Colombian coastline.

Then, sent by the Spanish Crown and assigned by special edict to engage with local natives, he accompanied Diego de Almagro and Francisco Pizarro during their first explorations along the coasts of Peru, and at the landing of Tacamez, north of Guayaquil, by then he already had command of the artillery. He was one of the "Famous Thirteen", who survived and remained in the islands of Gallo and Gorgona with Pizarro. From there, he subsequently launched the explorations of the Peruvian coastline and Inca ports; then, as part of the special assignment, he undertook to go in person to the Inca towns to engage with the locals and investigate their living conditions. He then visited Tumbez and then accompanied Pizarro to Spain to inform Charles V of their discoveries, the emperor made Candia commander-in-chief of artillery of the fleet sent out to conquer Peru.

He was present at the defeat and imprisonment of the Inca king Atahualpa, and received a large share of the ransom paid by him. While residing at Cuzco, he made arms and ammunition for Pizarro, who was then fighting against Almagro.

After the defeat of Almagro at the Battle of Las Salinas, Candia undertook the conquest of Ambaya beyond the Andes, but was unsuccessful, being finally arrested by order of Hernando Pizarro. Disgusted at his treatment, and deserted by his old friends, he then joined the followers of Almagro and, with the aid of sixteen other Greeks, brought the guns that were taken by young Almagro to the battle of Chupas, where Candia supported the local natives by performing badly in the battle. Almagro suspected treason and ordered his troops to kill Candia after attacking him with his own hands.

== Legacy ==
Based on his special assignment to engage with local natives by the Spanish Crown edict, Candia took special attention to communicating with the Incas and other vassal natives, that helped him to record his greatest discovery of the Golden Temple of the Sun built by Huayna Capac. Subsequently, Pedro de Candia's visits, discovery, and legacy were recorded by the Inca Garcilaso in the GVAINA CAPAC INGA, and by the Spaniard Pedro Cieza de León in his records of "Cronicas de Americas"; and later rendered in an image codex book by Felipe Guaman Poma de Ayala. His oldest brother Teodoro de Candia, became a priest and led Catholic Missions for the Spanish Crown in the Amazonian region of today's Misiones Province, his brother Juan Andres de Candia led a colonial development in Cusco, while Pedro's youngest brother, Juan Martín de Candia was assigned by the Spanish Crown to explore the Southern region of the continent alongside Pedro de Valdivia, the founder of Santiago, and settled in Chillán, Chile.

== See also ==
- Jorge Griego
- Famous Thirteen

== Sources ==
- Herrera y Tordesillas (Antonio de) Historia general de los hechos de los Castellanos en las islas y tierra firme del mar Oceano (1601-1615) in Colección clasicos Tavera (serie 1, Vol. 1-2) Edizione su CD.
- Tauro del Pino, Alberto: Enciclopedia Ilustrada del Perú. Tercera Edición. Tomo 3, BEI-CAN. Lima, PEISA, 2001. ISBN 9972-40-149-9
- Gómara (Francisco López de) Historia general de las Indias (1552) in Bibl. Aut. Esp. Tomo LXII, Madrid 1946
- Herrera y Tordesillas (Antonio de) Historia general de los hechos de los Castellanos en las islas y tierra firme del mar Oceano (1601-1615) in Colección clasicos Tavera (serie 1, Vol. 1-2) Edizione su CD
- Oviedo y Valdés (Gonzalo Fernández de) Historia general y natural de las Indias in Bibl Aut. Esp. Tomi CXVII; CXVIII; CXIX; CXX; CXXI, Madrid 1992
- Pizarro y Orellana (Fernando) "Vida del mariscal y adelantado Don Diego de Almagro el viejo y de su hijo Don Diego de Almagro" in Varones Illustres del Nuevo Mundo. Madrid 1639
- Pizarro (Pedro) Relación del descubrimiento y conquista de los Reynos del Perú. (1571) In Bibl. Aut. Esp. (tomo CLVIII, Madrid 1968)
- Garcilaso (Inca de la Vega) La conquista del Perú (1617) BUR, Milano 2001
- Zárate (Agustín de) Historia del descubrimiento y conquista de la provincia del Perú (1555) In Bibl. Aut. Esp. (tomo XXVI, Madrid 1947)
