= Spanish conquest of the Inca Empire =

Period of the Spanish conquest in South America

- Part of the Spanish colonization of the Americas
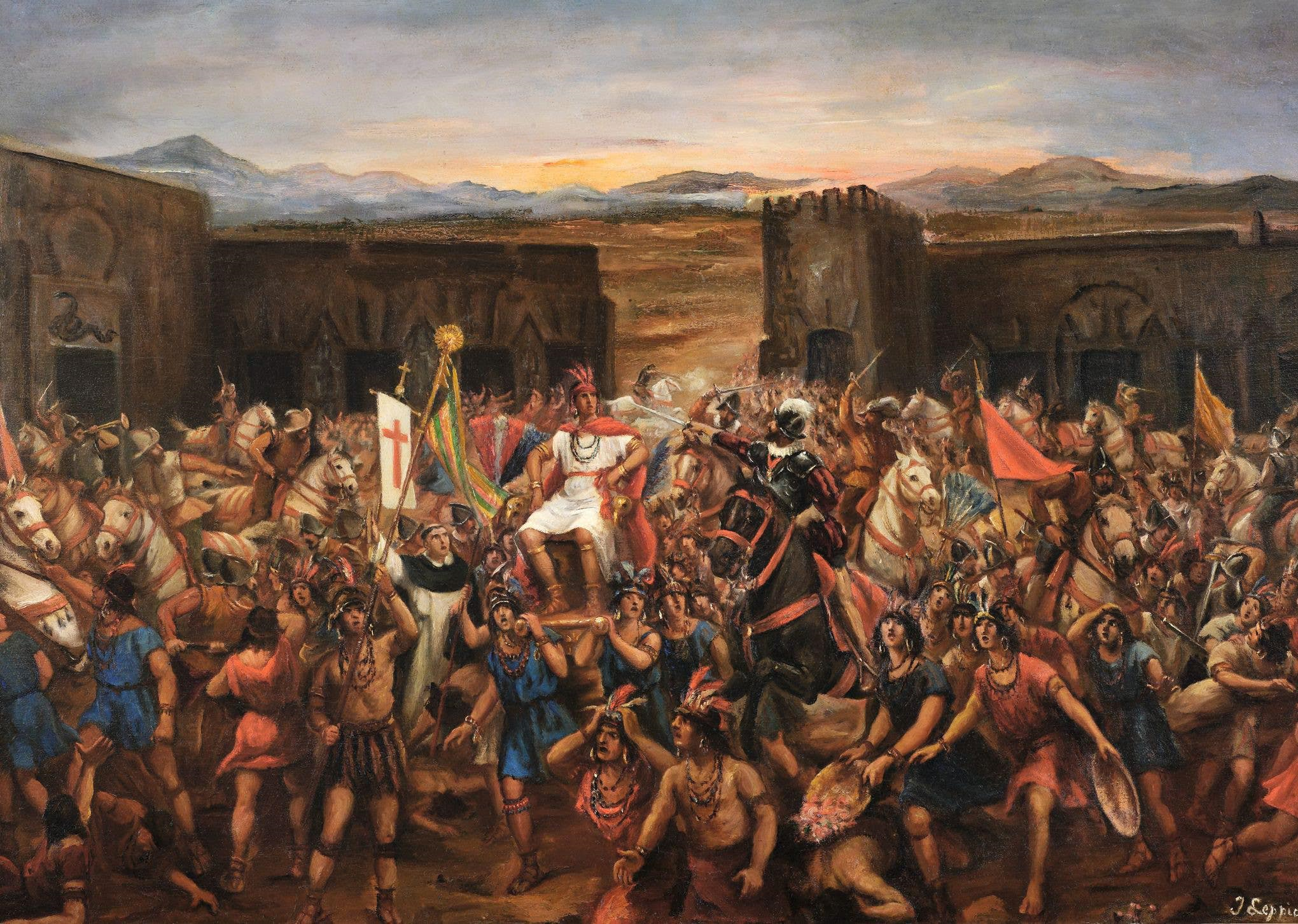
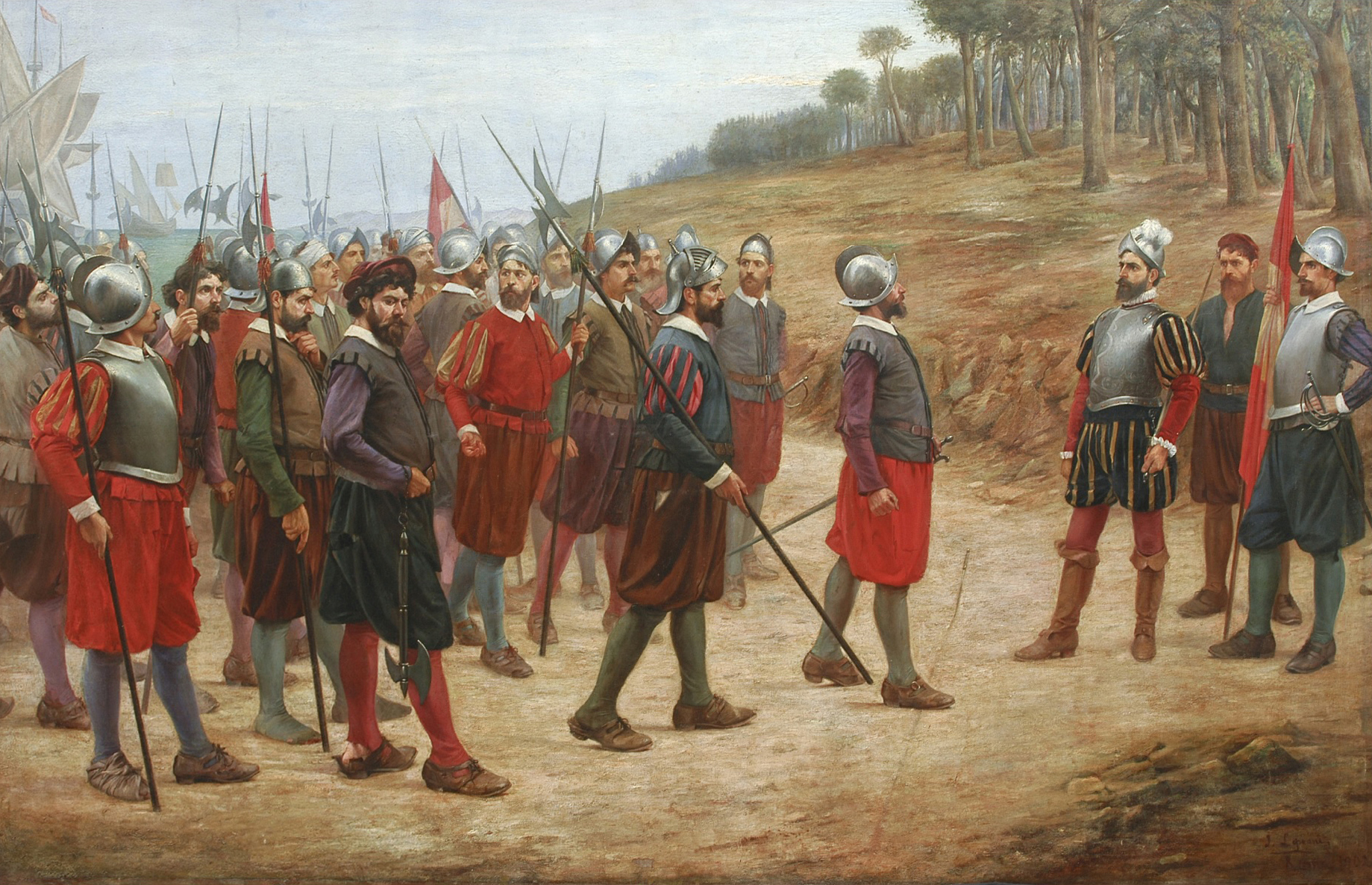
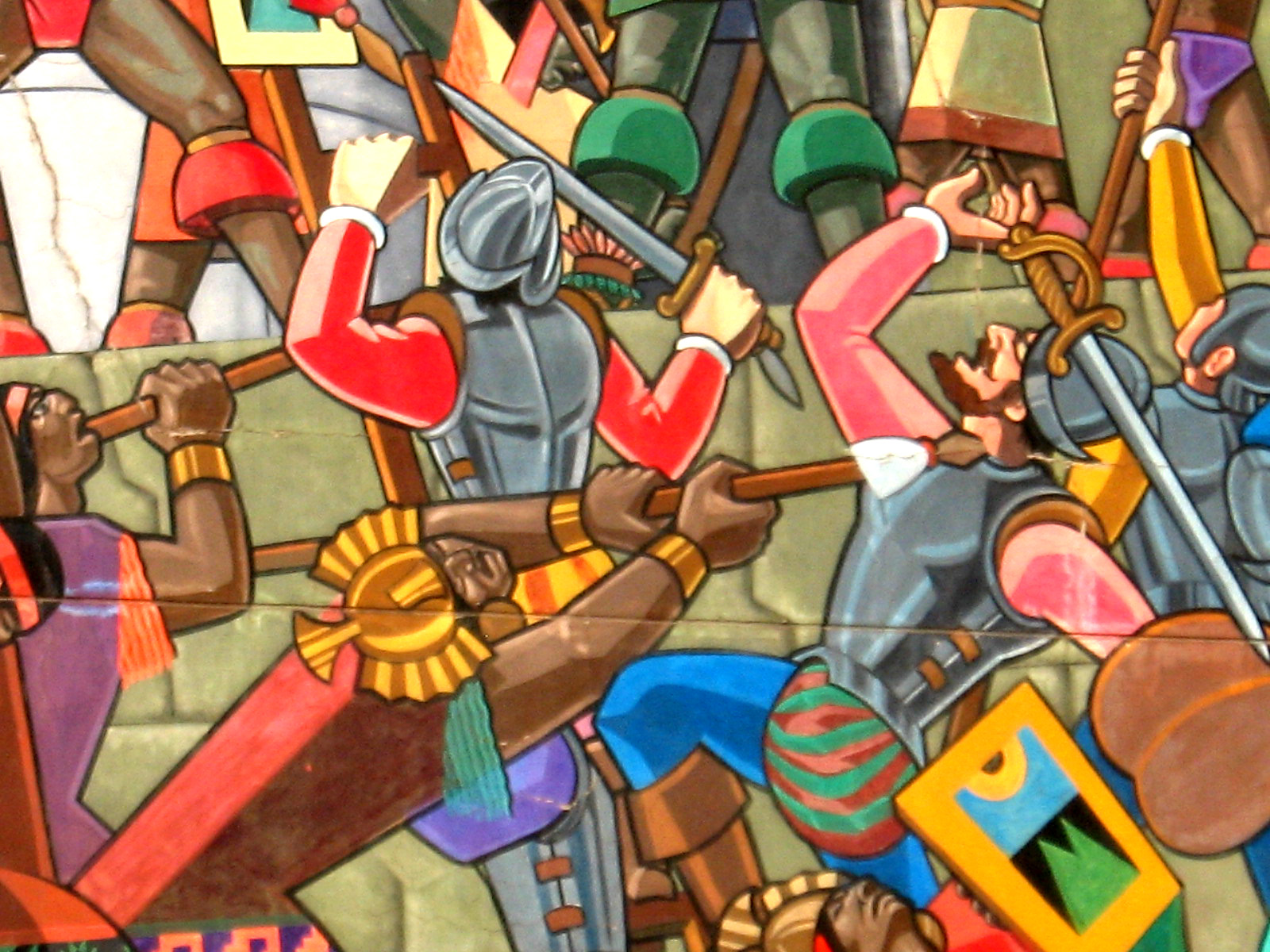
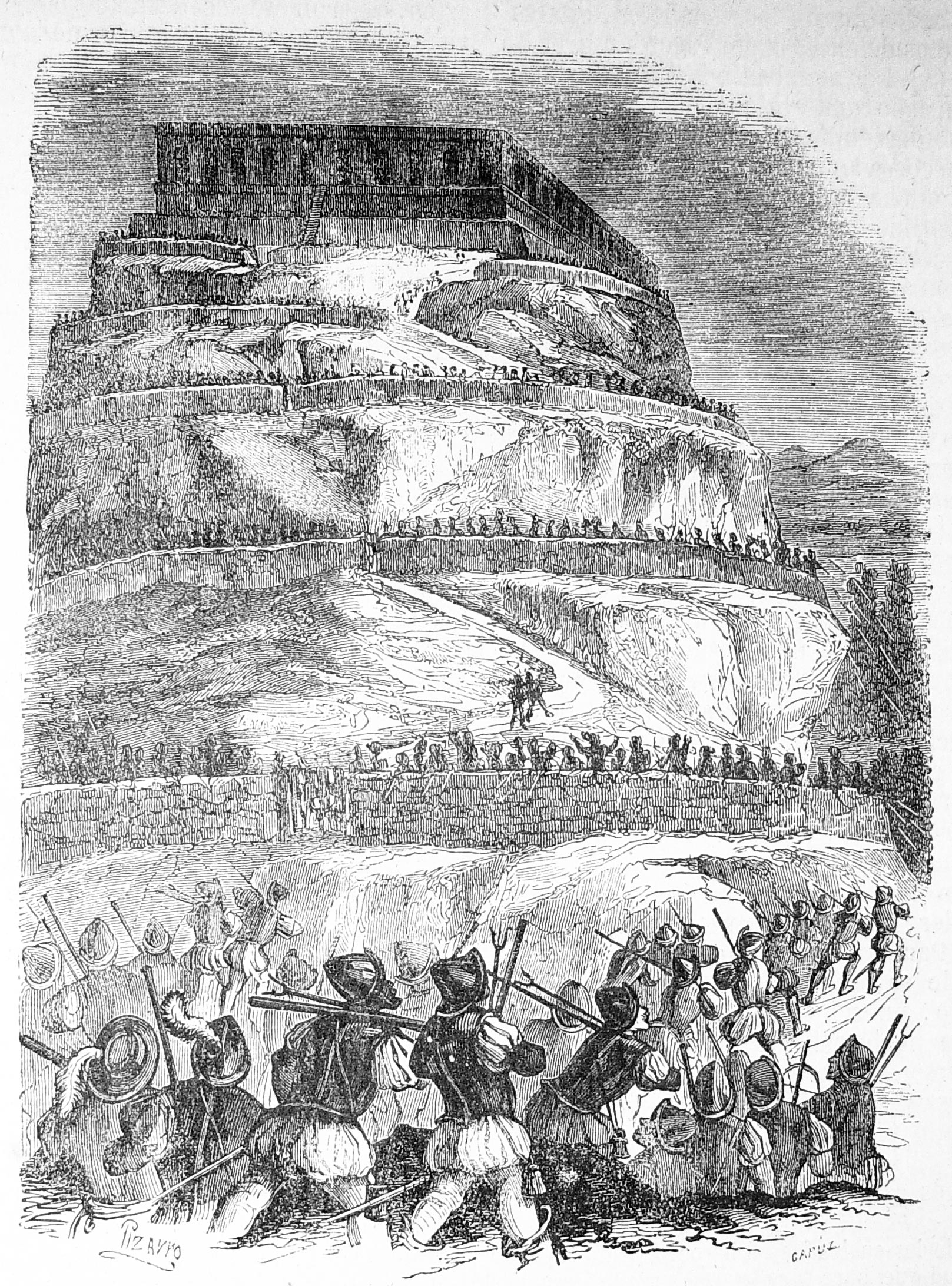
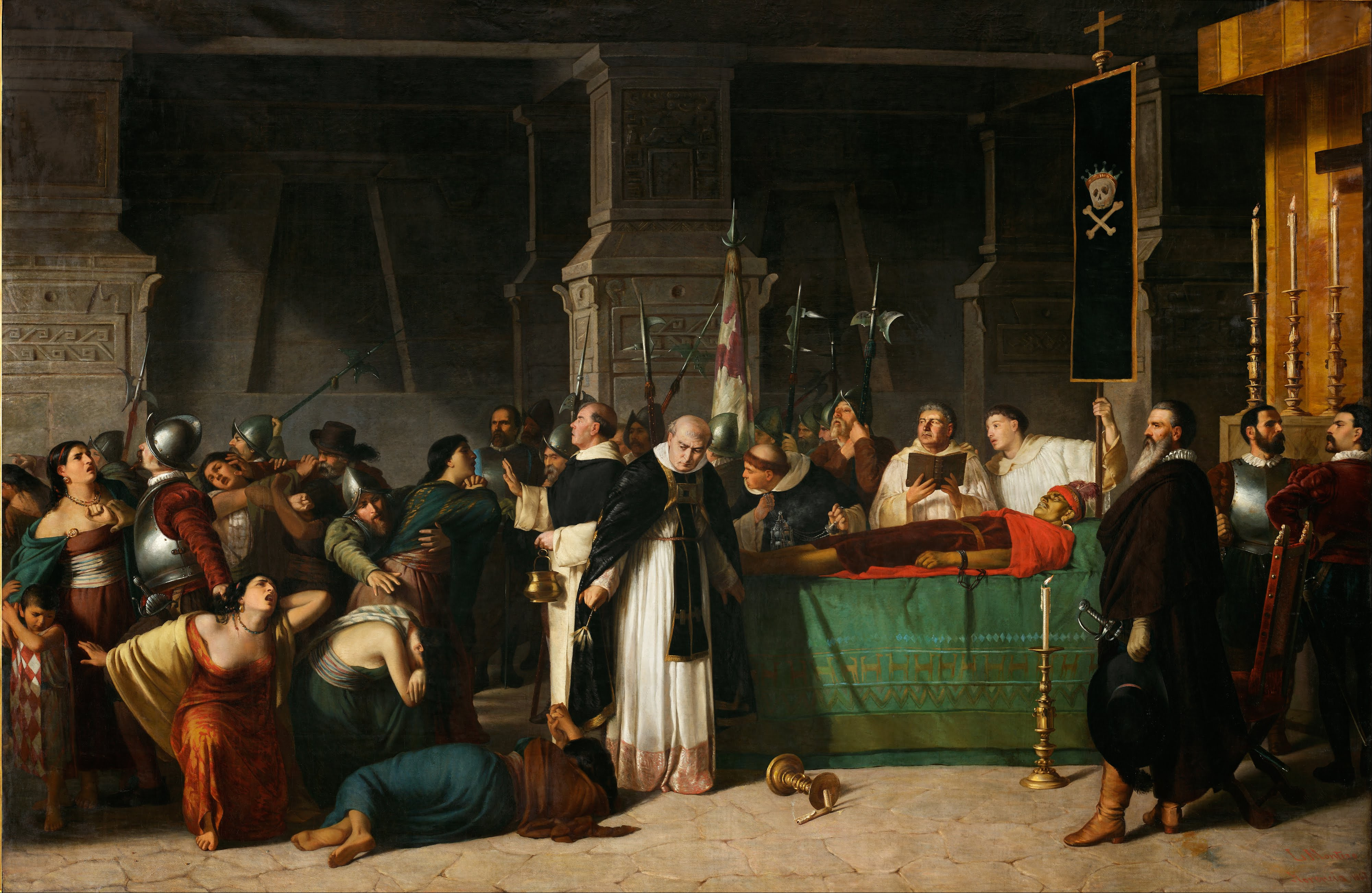
- From left to right: Capture of Atahualpa, the Famous Thirteen, Quizquiz's forces fighting Spanish forces, Battle of Ollantaytambo, and execution of Atahualpa
| Date | 1532–1572 |
| Location | Andes |
| Result | Spanish victory |
| Territorial changes | Former Incan Empire incorporated into the Spanish Empire |

Belligerents
| Spanish Empire (1537–1554): (Spanish Empire) New Castile (1529–1542); (Spanish Empire) New Toledo (1534–1542); (Spanish Empire) Viceroyalty of Peru (1542–1572); Indian auxiliaries: Cañari; Caxamarcas (various groups); Huancas; Chankas; Huaylas; Chachapoyas; Huáscaran Incas | Inca Empire (1532–1536); Neo-Inca State (1537‍–‍1572) |

Commanders and leaders
| (Spanish Empire) Francisco Pizarro X; (Spanish Empire) Diego de Almagro (executed); (Spanish Empire) Gonzalo Pizarro †; (Spanish Empire) Hernando Pizarro; (Spanish Empire) Juan Pizarro †; (Spanish Empire) Hernando de Soto; (Spanish Empire) Sebastián de Benalcázar; (Spanish Empire) Pedro de Alvarado; (Spanish Empire) Francisco de Toledo; (Inca Empire) Túpac Huallpa; (Inca Empire) Paullu Inca; (Inca Empire) Sayri Túpac (1558‍–‍1560); (Inca Empire) Chilche; (Inca Empire) Vilchumlay # | 1532–1535 (Inca Empire) Atahualpa (executed) (Inca Empire) Quizquiz † (Inca Empire) Chalcuchimac (executed) (Inca Empire) Rumiñawi † 1536–1572 (Inca Empire) Manco Inca X (Inca Empire) Sayri Túpac (1544‍–‍1558) (Inca Empire) Titu Cusi # (Inca Empire) Túpac Amaru I (executed) |

Strength
| 168 soldiers (1532); Unknown number of Indian auxiliaries; 3,000+ Spanish soldiers and 150,000 Indian allies (1535) | 100,000 soldiers (1532); 50,000 warriors (1535) |

Casualties and losses
- 7,000,000 after the initial conquest and disease outbreak

The Spanish empires's conquest of the Inca Empire, also known as the Conquest of Peru (Spanish: Conquista española del Imperio incaico), was one of the most important campaigns in the Spanish colonization of the Americas (the broader European colonization of the Americas). After years of preliminary exploration and military skirmishes, 168 Spanish soldiers under conquistador Francisco Pizarro, along with his brothers in arms and their Indigenous auxiliaries, captured the last Sapa Inca, Atahualpa, at the Battle of Cajamarca in 1532. It was the first step in a long campaign that took decades of fighting but ended in Spanish victory in 1572 and colonization of the region as the Viceroyalty of Peru. The conquest of the Inca Empire, led to spin-off campaigns into present-day Chile and Colombia, as well as expeditions to the Amazon Basin and the surrounding rainforest.

When the Spanish arrived at the borders of the Inca Empire in 1528, it spanned a considerable area and was by far the largest of the four grand pre-Columbian civilizations. Extending southward from the Ancomayo, which is now known as the Patía River, in southern present-day Colombia to the Maule River in what would later be known as Chile, and eastward from the Pacific Ocean to the edge of the Amazonian jungles, it covered some of the most mountainous terrains on Earth. In less than a century, the Inca had expanded their empire from about 400,000 km^{2} (150,000 sq mi) in 1448 to 1,800,000 km^{2} (690,000 sq mi) in 1528, just before the arrival of the Spanish. This vast area of land varied greatly in culture and climate. Because of the diverse cultures and geography, the Inca allowed many areas of the empire to be governed under the control of local leaders, who were watched and monitored by Inca officials. Under the administrative mechanisms established by the Inca, all parts of the empire answered to, and were ultimately under the direct control of, the Inca Emperor. Scholars estimate that the population of the Inca Empire was between 12 and 16 million.

Some scholars, such as Jared Diamond, believe that while the Spanish conquest was undoubtedly the proximate cause of the collapse of the Inca Empire, it may very well have been past its peak and already in the process of decline. In 1528, Emperor Huayna Capac ruled the Inca Empire. He could trace his lineage back to a "stranger king" named Manco Cápac, the mythical founder of the Inca clan, who, according to tradition, emerged from a cave in a region called Paqariq Tampu.

Huayna Capac was the son of the previous ruler, Túpac Inca, and the grandson of Pachacuti, the Emperor who, by conquest, had commenced the dramatic expansion of the Inca Empire from its cultural and traditional base in the area around Cusco. On his accession to the throne, Huayna Capac had continued the policy of expansion by conquest, taking Inca armies north into what is today Ecuador. While he had to put down a number of rebellions during his reign, by the time of his death, his legitimacy was unquestioned, as was the primacy of Inca power.

Expansion had caused its own set of problems. Many parts of the empire retained distinct cultures, which were at best reluctant to become part of the greater imperial project. Due to its size, and the fact that all communication and travel had to take place by foot or by boat, the Inca Empire proved increasingly difficult to administer and govern, with the Inca Emperor having increasingly less influence over local areas.

Huayna Capac relied on his sons to support his reign. While he had many children, both legitimate – born of his sister-wives, under the Inca system – and illegitimate, two sons are historically important. Prince Túpac Cusi Hualpa, also known as Huáscar, was the son of Coya Mama Rahua Occllo of the royal line. The second was Atahualpa, an illegitimate son who was likely born of a daughter of the last independent King of Quitu, one of the states conquered by Huayna Capac during the expansion of the Inca Empire. These two sons would play pivotal roles in the final years of the Inca Empire.

The Spanish conquistador Pizarro and his army of men were greatly aided in their enterprise by invading when the Inca Empire was in the midst of a war of succession between the princes Huáscar and Atahualpa. Atahualpa seems to have spent more time with Huayna Capac during the years when he was in the north with the army conquering Ecuador. Atahualpa was thus closer to and had better relations with the army and its leading generals. When both Huayna Capac and his eldest son and designated heir, Ninan Cuyochic, died suddenly in 1528 from what was probably smallpox, a disease introduced by the Spanish into the Americas, the question of who would succeed as emperor was thrown open. Huayna had died before he could nominate the new heir.

At the time of Huayna Capac's death, Huáscar was in the capital Cuzco, while Atahualpa was in Quito with the main body of the Inca army. Huáscar had himself proclaimed Sapa Inca (i.e. "Only Emperor") in Cuzco, but the army declared loyalty to Atahualpa. The resulting dispute led to the Inca Civil War, prior to the conquest.

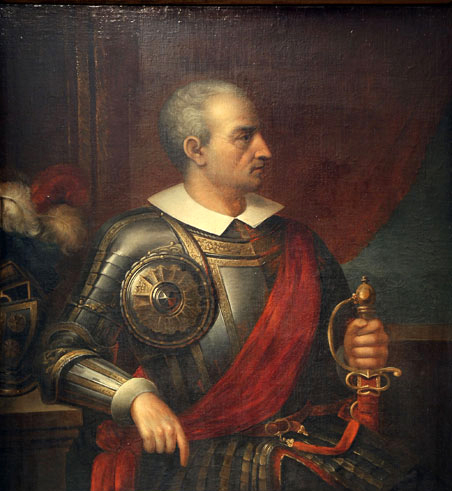
The conquistador Diego de Almagro, a native of the town of Almagro, one of the three partners in the conquest of Peru.

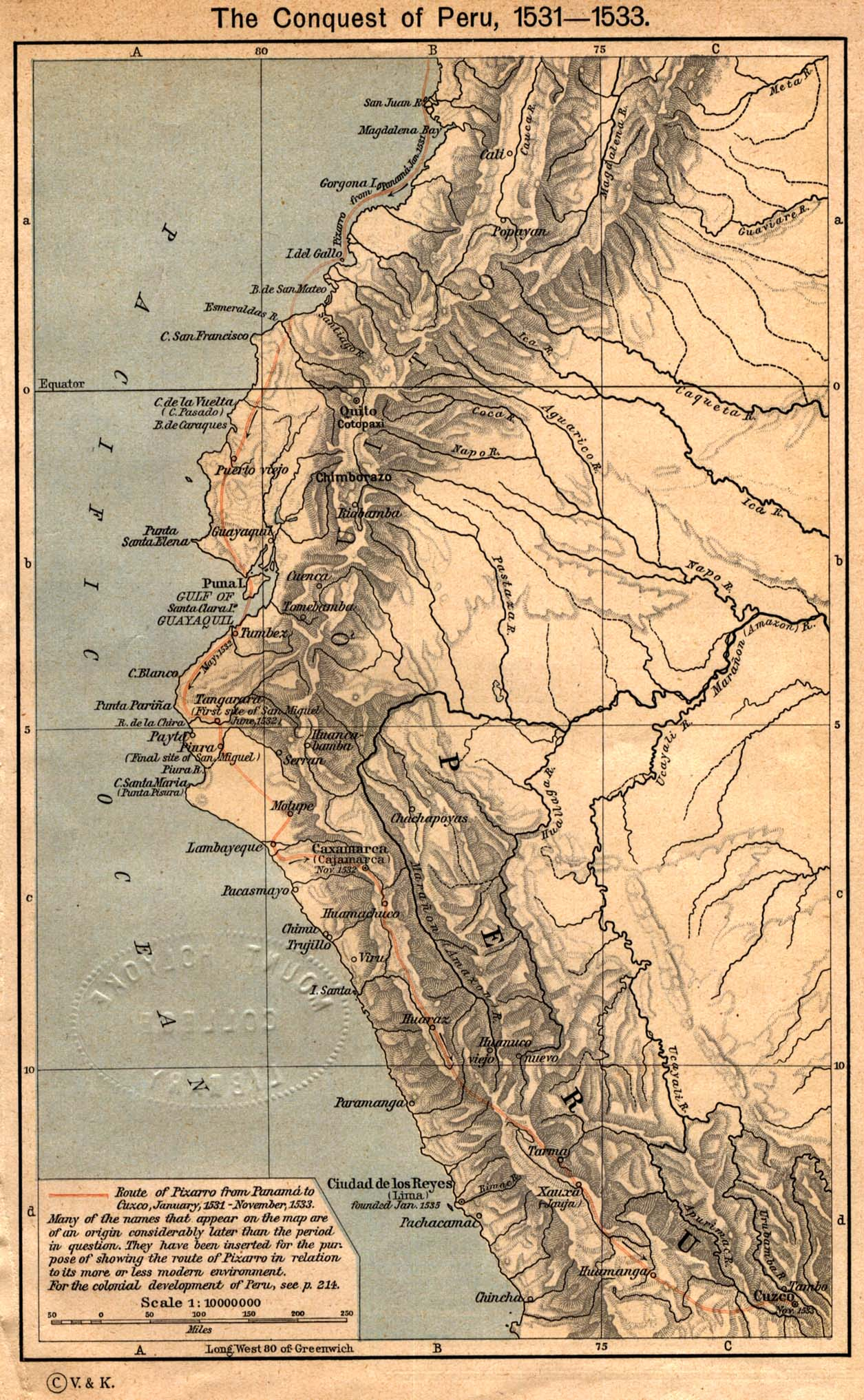
The route of the conquest of the Inca Empire by Pizarro and his conquistadors.

== Chronology of the last years of the Inca Empire ==
- c. 1528 – Francisco Pizarro and Diego de Almagro make first contact with the Inca Empire at Tumbes, the northernmost Inca stronghold along the coast. The Inca Emperor Huayna Capac died from European-introduced smallpox. Death sets off a civil war between his sons: Atahualpa and Huáscar
- 1528–1529 – Pizarro returns to Spain where the Queen of Spain grants him the license to conquer Peru
- 1531–1532 – Pizarro's third voyage to Peru. Spaniards form a bond with the Natives (Huancas, Chankas, Cañaris and Chachapoyas) who were under the oppression of the Inca Empire, and Pizarro includes them among his troops to face the Incas. Atahualpa is captured by Spanish.
- 1533 – Almagro arrives; Atahualpa is executed after he orders Huáscar to be killed; Pizarro subdues Cuzco and installs seventeen-year-old Manco Inca as new Inca Emperor
- 1535 – Pizarro founds the city of Lima; De Almagro leaves for present-day Chile
- 1536 – Gonzalo Pizarro steals Manco Inca's wife, Cura Olcollo. Manco rebels and surrounds Cuzco. Juan Pizarro is killed, and Inca general Quizo Yupanqui attacks Lima
- 1537 – Almagro seizes Cuzco from Hernando and Gonzalo Pizarro. Rodrigo Orgóñez sacks Vitcos and captures Manco Inca's son, Titu Cusi. Manco escapes and flees to Vilcabamba, which became the capital of the Neo-Inca State
- 1538 – Hernando Pizarro executes Diego de Almagro
- 1539 – Gonzalo Pizarro invades and sacks Vilcabamba; Manco Inca escapes but Francisco Pizarro executes Manco's wife, Cura Olcollo
- 1541 – Francisco Pizarro is murdered by Diego de Almagro II and other supporters of De Almagro
- 1544 – Manco Inca is murdered by supporters of Diego de Almagro. The Inca do not stop their revolt
- 1572 – Viceroy of Peru, Francisco Toledo, declares war on the Neo-Inca State; Vilcabamba is sacked and Túpac Amaru, the last Inca Emperor, is captured and executed in Cuzco. The Neo-Inca capital of Vilcabamba is abandoned; the Spanish remove inhabitants and relocate them to the newly established Christian town of San Francisco de la Victoria de Vilcabamba.

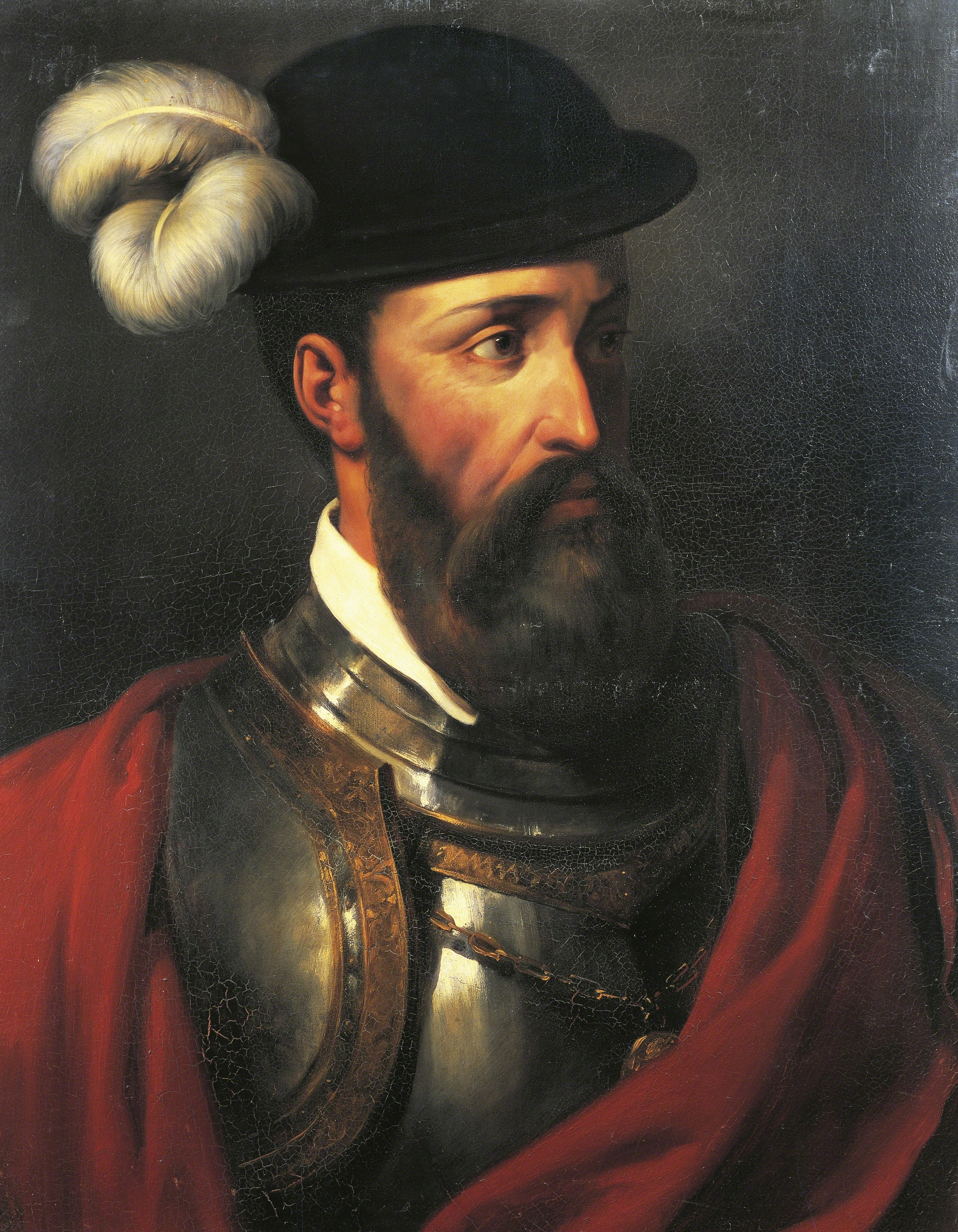
The conquistador Francisco Pizarro, a native of Trujillo

== Beginning of the conflict ==
The civil war between Atahualpa and Huascar weakened the empire immediately prior to its struggle with the Spanish. Historians are unsure if a united Inca Empire would have defeated the Spanish in the long term due to factors such as the high mortality from disease and the resulting social disruption, and the superior military technology of the conquistadors, who possessed horses, dogs, metal armor, swords, cannons, and primitive, but effective, firearms. Atahualpa appeared to be more popular with the people than his brother, and he was certainly more valued by the army, the core of which was based in the recently conquered northern province of Quito.

At the outset of the conflict, each brother controlled his respective domains, with Atahualpa secure in the north, and Huáscar controlling the capital of Cuzco and the large territory to the south, including the area around Lake Titicaca. This region had supplied large numbers of soldiers for Huáscar's forces. After a period of diplomatic posturing and jockeying for position, open warfare broke out. Huáscar seemed poised to bring the war to a rapid and decisive conclusion, as troops loyal to him took Atahualpa prisoner, while he was attending a festival in the city of Tumebamba. However, Atahualpa quickly escaped and returned to Quito. There, he was able to amass what is estimated to be at least 30,000 well-trained soldiers. While Huáscar managed to muster about the same number of soldiers, they were much less experienced.

Atahualpa sent his forces south under the command of two of his leading generals, Challcuchima and Quisquis, who won an uninterrupted series of victories against Huáscar that soon brought them to the very gates of Cuzco. On the first day of the battle for Cuzco, the forces loyal to Huáscar gained an early advantage. However, on the second day, Huáscar personally led an ill-advised "surprise" attack, of which the generals Challcuchima and Quisquis had advanced knowledge. In the ensuing battle, Huáscar was captured, and resistance completely collapsed. The victorious generals sent word north by chasqui messenger to Atahualpa, who had moved south from Quito to the royal resort springs outside Cajamarca. The messenger arrived with news of the final victory on the same day that Pizarro and his small band of adventurers, together with some Indian auxiliaries, descended from the Andes into the town of Cajamarca.

== Arrival of Pizarro ==
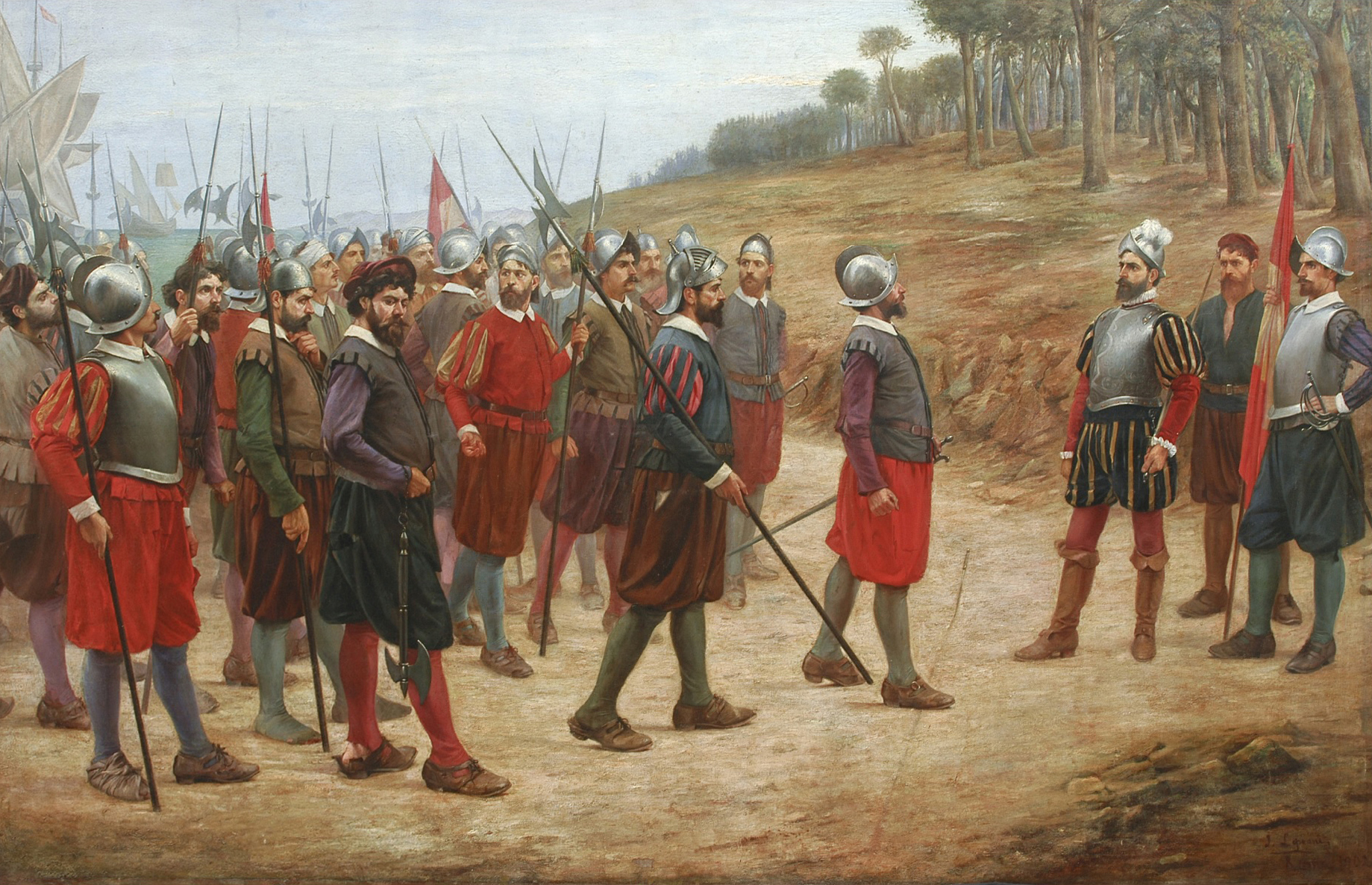
The Famous Thirteen by Juan Lepiani

Francisco Pizarro and his brothers (Gonzalo, Juan, and Hernando) were attracted by the rumors of a rich and fabulous kingdom. They had left the then-impoverished Extremadura, like many settlers after them.

There lies Peru with its riches;
Here, Panama and its poverty.
Choose, each man, what best becomes a brave Castilian.

— Francisco Pizarro

In 1529, Francisco Pizarro obtained permission from the Spanish Monarchy to conquer the land they called Peru.

According to historian Raúl Porras Barrenechea, Peru is not a Quechuan or Caribbean word, but a Indo-European or hybrid word. Unknown to Pizarro, as he was lobbying for permission to mount an expedition, his proposed enemy was being devastated by the diseases brought to the American continents during earlier Spanish contacts.

When Pizarro arrived in Peru in 1532, he found it vastly different from when he had been there just five years before. Amid the ruins of the city of Tumbes, he tried to piece together the situation before him. From two local boys, whom Pizarro had taught how to speak Spanish in order to translate for him, Pizarro learned of the civil war and of the disease that was destroying the Inca Empire.

After four long expeditions, Pizarro established the first Spanish settlement in northern Peru, calling it San Miguel de Piura.

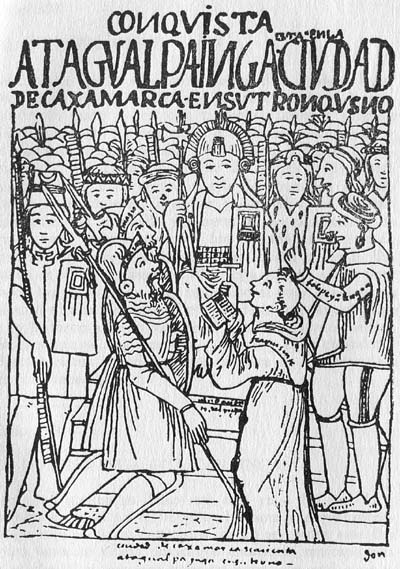
Francisco Pizarro meets with Atahualpa, 1532

When first spotted by the American Indians, Conquistador Pizarro and his men were thought to be Viracocha Cuna or "gods". The Indians described Pizarro's men to the Inca. They said that capito was tall with a full beard and was completely wrapped in clothing. The Indians described the men's swords and how they killed sheep with them. The men did not eat human flesh, but rather sheep, lamb, duck, pigeons, and deer, and cooked the meat. Atahualpa was fearful of what the newly arrived white men were capable of. If they were runa quicachac or "destroyers of peoples", then he should flee. If they were Viracocha Cuna Runa allichac or "gods who are benefactors of the people", then he should not flee, but welcome them. The messengers went back to Tangarala, and Atahualpa sent Cinquinchara, an Orejon warrior, to the Spanish to serve as an interpreter.

After traveling with the Spanish, Cinquinchara returned to Atahualpa; they discussed whether or not the Spanish men were gods. Cinquinchara decided they were men because he saw them eat, drink, dress, and have relations with women. He saw them produce no miracles. Cinquinchara informed Atahualpa that they were small in number, about 170–180 men, and had bound the American Indian captives with "iron ropes". When Atahualpa asked what to do about the strangers, Cinquinchara advised that they be killed because they were evil thieves who would take whatever they wanted, and were "supai cuna" or "devils". He recommended trapping the men inside of their sleeping quarters and burning them to death.

== Role of Indian auxiliaries ==
The role of Indian tribes was crucial to the Spanish Empire overtaking the Inca Empire. First the Huanca tribe had been under control for hundreds of years. They helped the Spanish as they thought this would be a chance to gain revenge. The Cañari led by Vilchumlay helped the Spanish because Atahualpa and his men devastated all of the lands and killed many Cañari people during the Inca Civil War. The last tribe, Chachapoyas sided with the Spanish because they desired independence and felt that this was a great opportunity. In battle, many natives battled with the Spanish. For example, when Pizarro's forces were going to capture Cuzco, the Huanca and Cañari reinforced Pizarro's army. If not for the indigenous people, Spanish success in battles would plummet. The indigenous soldiers provided pivotal manpower for battles, providing the Spanish with far more soldiers than they came with.

== Capture of Atahualpa ==
After his victory and the capture of his brother Huáscar, Atahualpa was fasting in the Inca baths outside Cajamarca. Pizarro and his men reached the city on 15 November 1532.

Pizarro sent Hernando de Soto to Atahualpa's camp. De Soto rode to meet Atahualpa on his horse, an animal that Atahualpa had never seen before. (Note: European horses were not native to the Americas, with the last ancestor, Eohippus, dying out about 50,000 years ago, long before the arrival of humans roughly 16,000 years ago.) With one of his young interpreters, Soto read a prepared speech to Atahualpa telling him that they had come as servants of God to teach them the truth about God's word. He said he was speaking to them so that they might:

"lay the foundation of concord, brotherhood, and perpetual peace that should exist between us, so that you may receive us under your protection and hear the divine law from us and all your people may learn and receive it, for it will be the greatest honor, advantage, and salvation to them all."

Additionally, they invited the Inca leader to visit Pizarro at his quarters along the Cajamarca plaza. When De Soto noticed Atahualpa's interest in his horse, he put on a display of "excellent horsemanship" in close proximity. Atahualpa displayed hospitality by serving refreshments.

Atahualpa responded only after Francisco Pizarro's brother, Hernando Pizarro, arrived. He replied with what he had heard from his scouts, that the Spanish had been killing and enslaving countless numbers of people and civilians on the coast. Pizarro denied the report and Atahualpa, with limited information, reluctantly let the matter go. At the end of their meeting, the men agreed to meet the next day at Cajamarca.

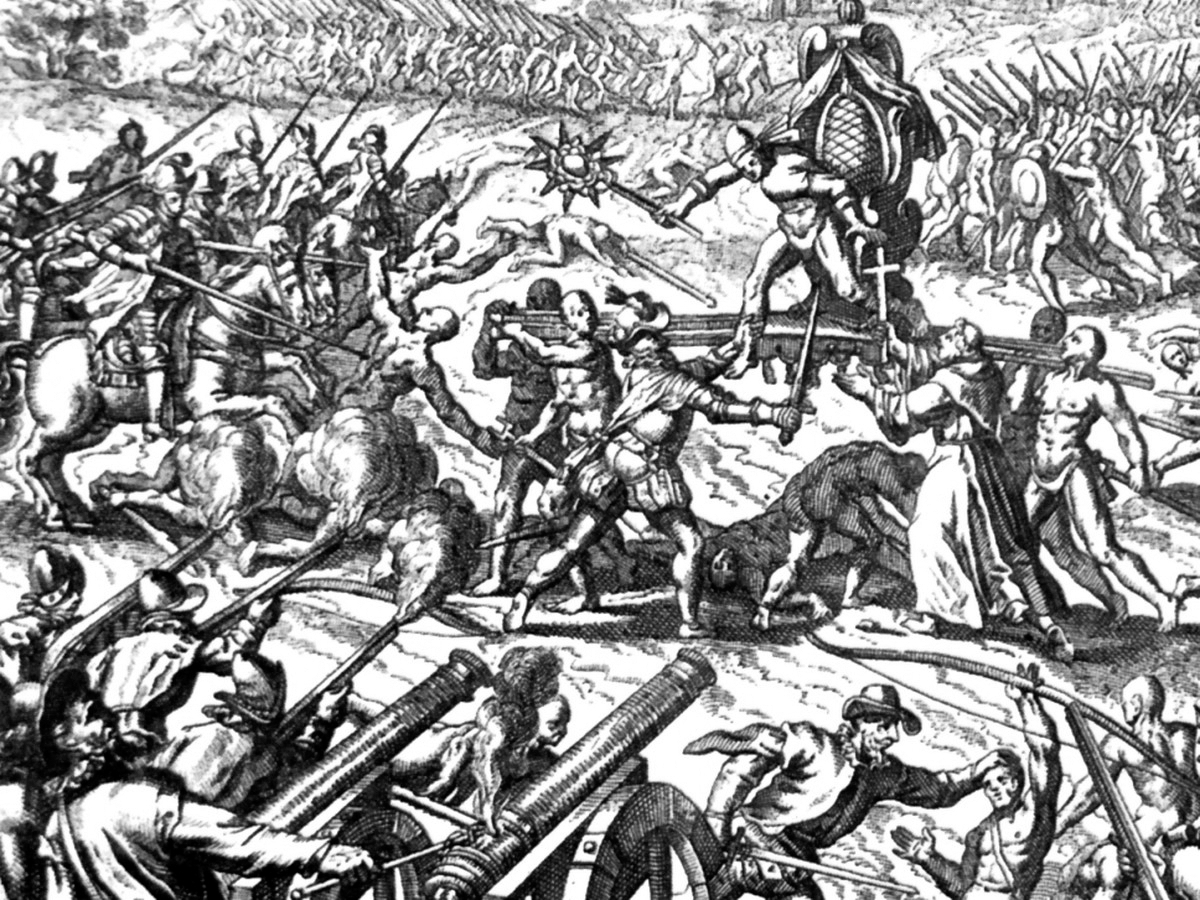
The Inca–Spanish confrontation in the Battle of Cajamarca left thousands of natives dead

The next morning, on 16 November 1532, Pizarro had arranged an ambuscade around the Cajamarca plaza, where they were to meet. At this point, Pizarro had in total 168 men under his command: 106 on foot and 62 on horseback. When Atahualpa arrived with about 6,000 unarmed followers, Friar Vincente de Valverde and the interpreter Felipillo met them and proceeded to "expound the doctrines of the true faith" (requerimiento) and seek his tribute as a vassal of King Charles. The unskilled translator likely contributed to problems in communication. The friar offered Atahualpa the Bible as the authority of what he had just stated. Atahualpa stated, "I will be no man's tributary."

Pizarro urged attack, starting the Battle of Cajamarca. The battle began with a shot from a cannon and the battle cry "Santiago!" The Spaniards unleashed volleys of gunfire at the vulnerable mass of Incas and surged forward in a concerted action. Pizarro also used devastating cavalry charges against the Inca forces, which stunned them in combination with the supporting gunfire. However, many of the guns used by the Spaniards were hard to use in close-quarters combat. The effect was devastating, and the shocked Incas offered such feeble resistance that the battle has often been labeled a massacre, with the 2,000 Incas slain and the Spanish with only one soldier wounded.

Though the historical accounts relating to the circumstances vary, the true Spanish motives for the attack seemed to be a desire for loot and flat-out impatience. The Inca likely did not adequately understand the conquistadors' demands. Pizarro knew that his forces were badly outnumbered but that capturing the Emperor and holding him hostage would give him a key edge.

The majority of Atahualpa's troops were in the Cuzco region along with Quisquis and Challcuchima, the two generals he trusted the most. This was a major disadvantage for the Inca. Their undoing also resulted from a lack of self-confidence, and a desire to make public demonstration of fearlessness and godlike command of situation. The main view is that the Inca were eventually defeated due to inferior weapons, 'open battle' tactics, disease, internal unrest, the bold tactics of the Spanish, and the capture of the Inca's Emperor. Spanish armor was very effective against most of the Andean weapons, though it was not entirely impenetrable to maces, clubs, or slings. Later, most natives adapted in 'guerrilla fashion' by only shooting at the legs of the conquistadors if they happened to be unarmored. However, ensuing hostilities such as the Mixtón Rebellion, Chichimeca War, and Arauco War would require that the conquistadors ally with friendly tribes in these later expeditions.

By February 1533, Almagro had joined Pizarro in Cajamarca with an additional 150 men with 50 horses.

After the Spanish captured Atahualpa at the massacre at Cajamarca, they allowed his wives to join him, and the Spanish soldiers taught him the game of chess. During Atahualpa's captivity, the Spanish, although greatly outnumbered, forced him to order his generals to back down by threatening to kill him if he did not. According to the Spanish envoy's demands, Atahualpa offered to fill a large room with gold and promised twice that amount in silver. While Pizarro ostensibly accepted this offer and allowed the gold to pile up, he had no intention of releasing the Inca. He needed Atahualpa's influence over his generals and the people in order to maintain the peace. The treasure began to be delivered from Cuzco on 20 December 1532 and flowed steadily from then on. By 3 May 1533 Pizarro received all the treasure he had requested; it was melted, refined, and made into bars. Hernando Pizarro went to gather gold and silver from the temples in Pachacamac in January 1533, and on his return in March, captured Chalcuchimac in the Jauja Valley. Francisco Pizzaro sent a similar expedition to Cuzco, bringing back many gold plates from the Temple of the Sun.

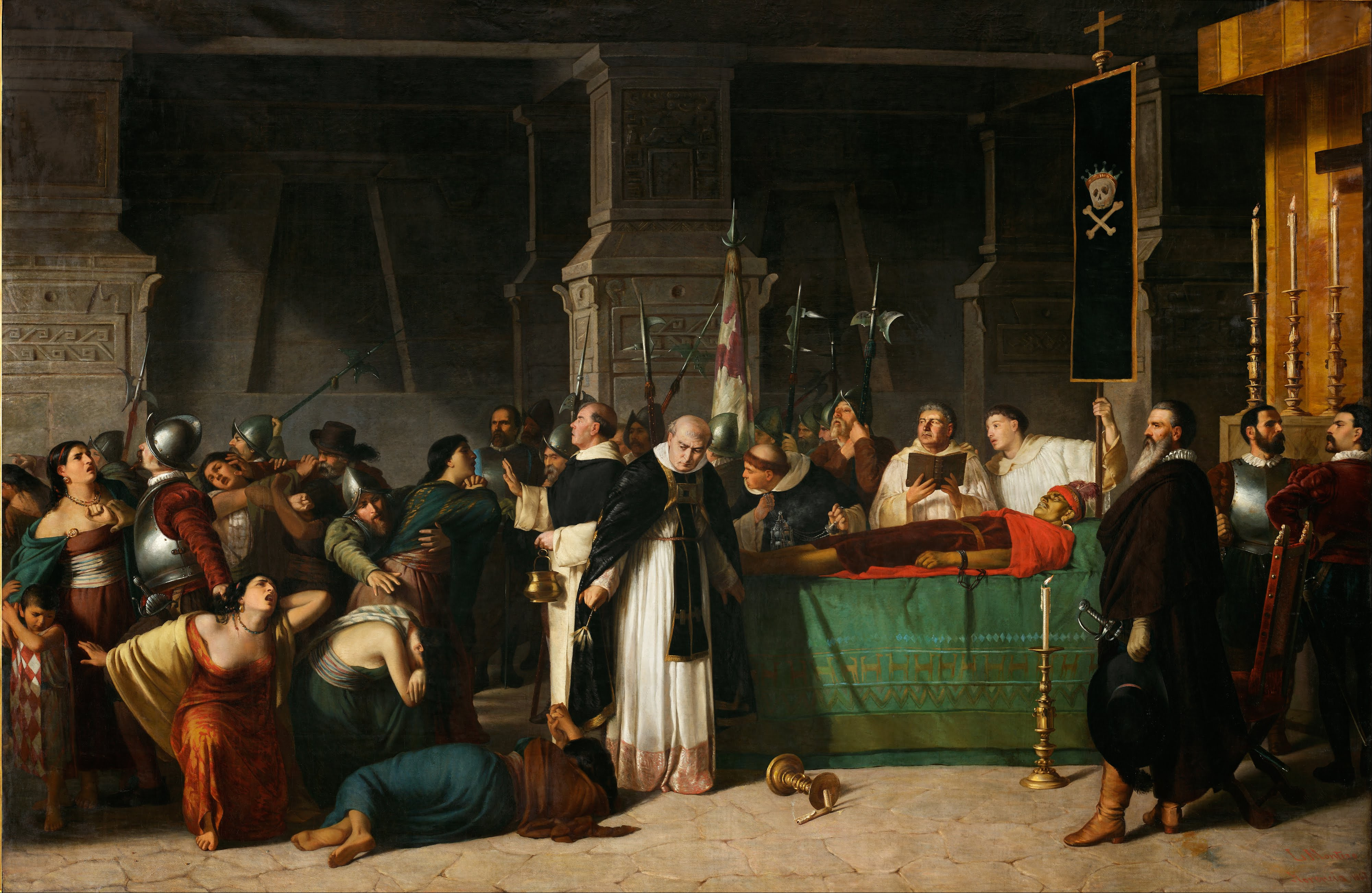
One of the main events in the conquest of Peru was the death of Atahualpa, the last Sapa Inca on 29 August 1533

The question eventually came up of what to do with Atahualpa; both Pizarro and Soto reportedly spoke against killing him, but the other Spaniards were loud in their demands for death. False interpretations from the interpreter Felipillo made the Spaniards paranoid. They were told that Atahualpa had ordered secret attacks and his warriors were hidden in the surrounding area. Soto went with a small force to scout for the hidden army, and the show trial of Atahualpa was held in his absence. Among the charges were polygamy, incestuous marriage, and idolatry, all frowned upon in Catholicism but common in Inca culture and religion.

The men who were against Atahualpa's conviction and murder argued that he should be judged by King Charles since he was the sovereign prince. Atahualpa was forced to submit to baptism to avoid being burned at the stake and in the hopes of one day rejoining his army and killing the Spanish; they referred to him as Francisco for the purposes of the ritual. On 29 August 1533 the Spanish captors murdered Atahualpa by garrotting. He was buried with Christian rites in the church of San Francisco at Cajamarca, but was soon disinterred. His body was recovered, probably at his prior request, and borne to its final resting place in Quito. Upon de Soto's return, he was furious; he had found no evidence of any secret gathering of Atahualpa's warriors.

Pizarro advanced with his army of 500 Spaniards toward Cuzco, accompanied by Chalcuchimac. The latter was burned alive in the Jauja Valley, accused of secret communication with Quizquiz, and organizing resistance. Manco Inca Yupanqui joined Pizarro after the death of Túpac Huallpa. Pizarro's force entered the heart of the Tawantinsuyu on 15 November 1533.

Benalcázar, Pizarro's lieutenant and fellow Extremaduran, had already departed from San Miguel with 140 foot soldiers and a few horses on his conquering mission to Ecuador. At the foot of Mount Chimborazo, near the modern city of Riobamba (Ecuador) he met and defeated the forces of the great Inca warrior Rumiñawi with the aid of Cañari tribesmen, led by Chilche, who served as guides and allies to the conquering Spaniards. Rumiñahui fell back to Quito, and, while in pursuit of the Inca army, Benalcázar was joined by five hundred men led by Guatemalan Governor Pedro de Alvarado. Greedy for gold, Alvarado had set sail for the south without the crown's authorization, landed on the Ecuadorian coast, and marched inland to the Sierra. Finding Quito empty of its people's treasure, Alvarado soon joined the combined Spanish force. Alvarado agreed to sell his fleet of twelve ships, his forces, plus arms and ammunition, and returned to Guatemala.

== Rebellion and reconquest ==
After Atahualpa's murder, Pizarro installed Atahualpa's brother, Túpac Huallpa, as a puppet Inca ruler, but he soon died unexpectedly, leaving Manco Inca Yupanqui in power. He began his rule as an ally of the Spanish and was respected in the southern regions of the empire, but there was still much unrest in the north near Quito where Atahualpa's generals were amassing troops. Atahualpa's murder meant that there was no hostage left to deter these northern armies from attacking the invaders. Led by Atahualpa's generals Rumiñahui, Zope-Zupahua and Quisquis, the native armies were finally defeated, effectively ending any organized rebellion in the north of the empire.

Manco Inca initially had good relations with Francisco Pizarro and several other Spanish conquistadors. However, in 1535 he was left in Cuzco under the control of Pizarro's brothers, Juan and Gonzalo, who so mistreated Manco Inca that he ultimately rebelled. Under the pretense of recovering a statue of pure gold in the nearby Yucay valley, Manco was able to escape Cuzco.

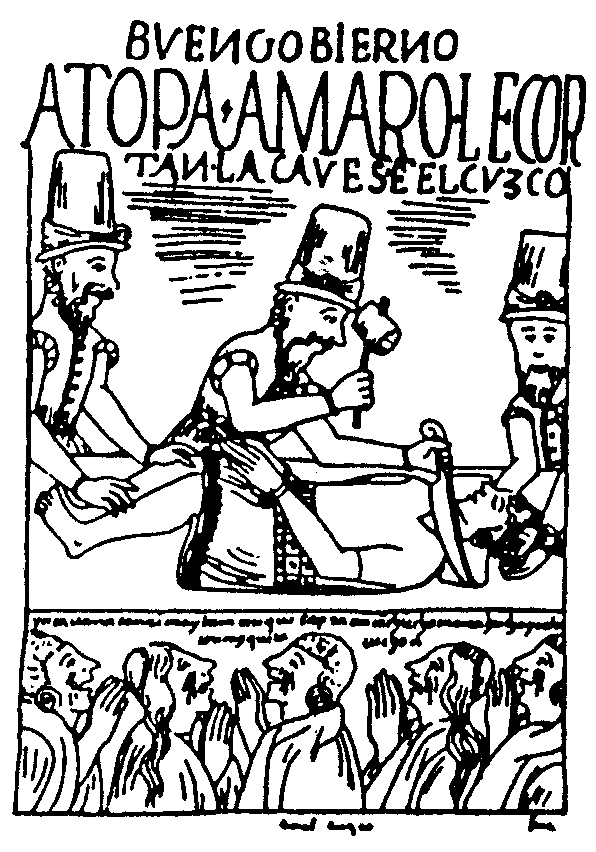
Spaniards executing Tupac Amaru I.

Manco Inca hoped to use the disagreement between Almagro and Pizarro to his advantage and attempted the recapture of Cuzco starting in April 1536. The siege of Cuzco was waged until the following spring, and during that time Manco's armies managed to wipe out four relief columns sent from Lima, but was ultimately unsuccessful in its goal of routing the Spaniards from the city. The Inca leadership did not have the full support of all its subject peoples and furthermore, the degrading state of Inca morale coupled with the superior Spanish siege weapons soon made Manco Inca realize his hope of recapturing Cuzco was failing. Manco Inca eventually withdrew to Tambo.

Archaeological evidence of the rebellion incident exists, showing that the Spanish conquistadors were aided by native Indian allies. The remains of about 70 men, women, and adolescents were found in the path of a planned expressway near Lima in 2007. Forensic evidence suggests that European weapons killed some of the natives, probably during the uprising in 1536, but that the vast majority had been killed by local, indigenous weapons.

After the Spanish re-occupied Cuzco, Manco Inca and his armies retreated to the fortress at Ollantaytambo where he, for a time, successfully launched attacks against Pizarro based at Cuzco and even managed to defeat the Spanish occupiers in an open battle.

When it became clear that defeat was imminent, Manco Inca retreated further to the mountainous region of Vilcabamba and established the small Neo-Inca State, where Manco Inca and his successors continued to hold some power for several more decades. His son, Túpac Amaru, was the last Inca, being killed by the Spanish in 1572.

In total, the conquest took about forty years to complete. Many Inca attempts to regain their empire had occurred, but none had been successful. Thus the Spanish conquest was achieved, aided by factors like smallpox and a great communication and cultural divide. The Spaniards destroyed much of the Inca culture and imposed Spanish culture onto the native population.

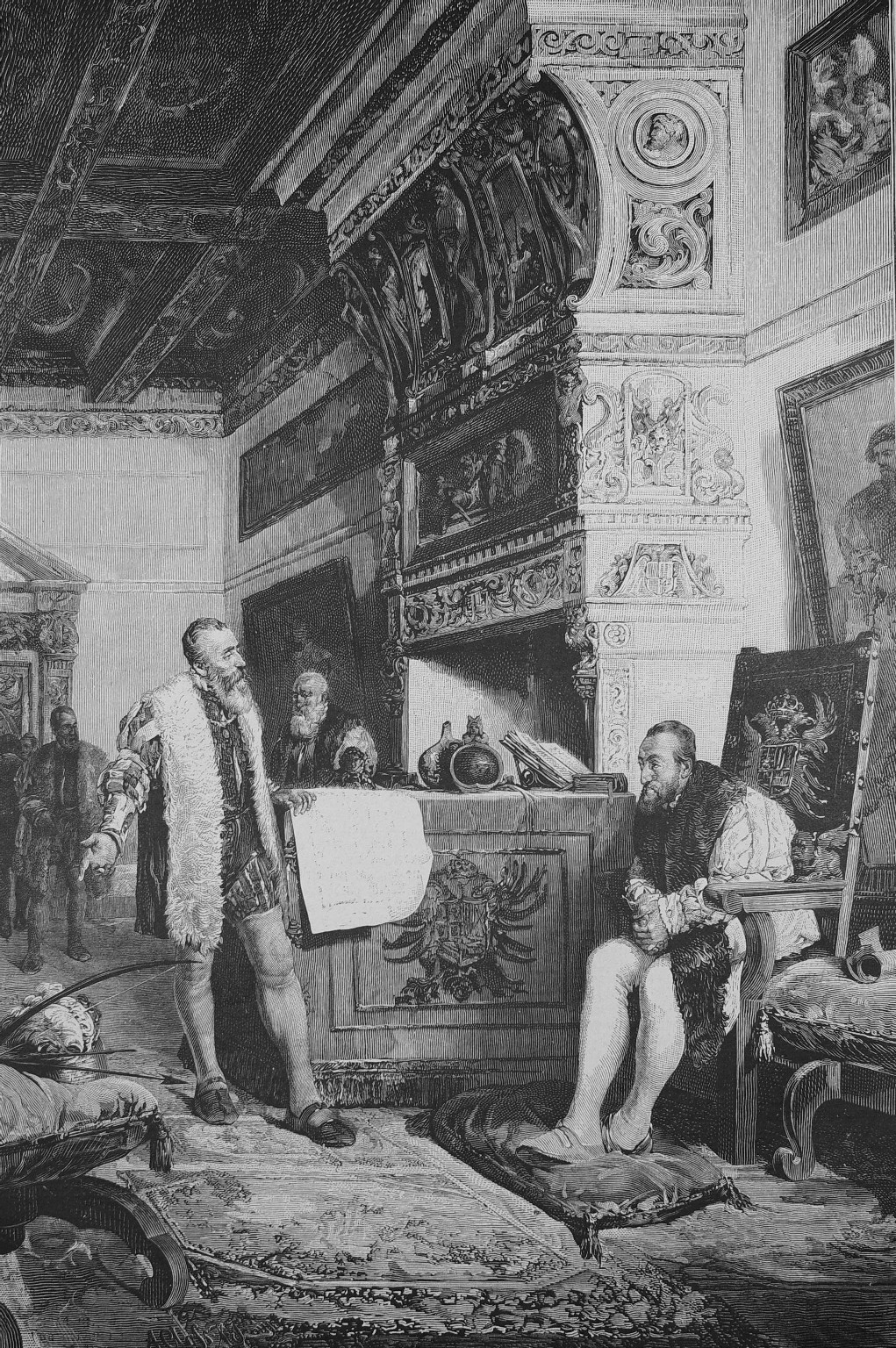
Engraving depicting the Spanish conquistador Francisco Pizarro exposing before King Carlos I of Spain the evidence of the discovery of the fabulous Empire of the Incas.

== Spanish Civil War: Pizarro v. Almagro ==
Francisco Pizarro and Diego de Almagro were allies while taking over the Inca Empire. The relationship became shaky when they had disputes over the land and wealth of the Empire. Almagro was mostly angry over his share of fortune, particularly in the southern territories. Later in 1536, Almagro went on an expedition to Chile to find new regions. The expedition was a complete failure. Almagro fought harsh conditions, had little to no resources, and even faced resistance from other indigenous tribes. When Almagro returned with almost nothing, his anger grew towards Pizarro.

After Almagro's failed expedition, he demanded Pizarro give him more power. Pizarro declined which led to an open conflict between him and Almagro. In 1537, Almagro started to fight over Cuzco and other territories with Pizarro. Both men fought for total control over the land and resources. In 1538 was the Battle of Las Salinas, a fight between Pizarro and Almagro's men. Pizarro's troops won but the battle was costly and severely weakened his position for power.

After Almagro's defeat in battle, he was captured. Almagro was executed in 1538. His death gave most of the power of the Empire to Pizarro. Still Almagro's supporters and his son, Diego de Almagro the Younger, sought revenge. In 1541, Pizarro was assassinated by Almagro's supporters. This led to an unstable ruling. While the Spanish did regain control, it delayed their attempt to have a stable government.

== Aftermath ==
Pizarro and his followers founding Lima

A struggle for power resulted in a long civil war between Francisco Pizarro and Diego de Almagro in which Almagro was killed. Almagro's loyal followers and his descendants later avenged his death by killing Pizarro in 1541. This was done inside the palace of Francisco Pizarro in a fight to the death by these assassins, most of which were former soldiers of Diego de Almagro who were stripped of title and belongings after his death.

Despite the war, the Spaniards did not neglect the colonizing process. Spanish royal authority on these territories was consolidated by the creation of an Audiencia Real, a type of appellate court. In January 1535, Lima was founded, from which the political and administrative institutions were to be organized. In 1542, the Spanish created the Viceroyalty of New Castile, that shortly after would be called Viceroyalty of Peru. Nevertheless, the Viceroyalty of Peru was not organized until the arrival of a later Viceroy, Francisco de Toledo, in 1569. Toledo ended the indigenous Neo-Inca State in Vilcabamba, executing the Inca Túpac Amaru. He resettled the indigenous people in Spanish-style settlements in a process called reductions, promoted economic development using commercial monopoly and increased the production of the silver mines of Potosí, using an Inca institution of forced labor for mandatory public service called mita.

The integration of Spanish culture into Peru was carried out not only by Pizarro and his other captains, but also by the many Spanish who also came to Peru to exploit its riches and inhabit its land. These included many different kinds of immigrants such as Spanish merchants, peasants, artisans, and Spanish women. Another element that the Spanish brought with them were African slaves to work alongside captive Incas for use in labor with things such as agriculture and mining for silver. These people all brought with them their own pieces of Spanish culture to integrate into Peruvian society.

=== Effects of the conquest on the people of Peru ===
The long-term effects of the arrival of the Spanish on the population of South America were catastrophic. While this was the case for every group of Native-Americans invaded by Europeans during this time period, the Inca population suffered an exceptionally dramatic and rapid decline following contact. The population decline for the Inca Empire from 1520 to 1571 is roughly estimated at from 10 to 15 million in 1520 to less than 3 million in 1570 with the population still declining after 1570.

The single greatest cause of the decimation of native populations was Old World infectious diseases, carried by colonists and conquistadors. As these were new to the natives, they had no acquired immunity and suffered very high rates of death. More died of disease than any army or armed conflict. As the Inca did not have as strong a writing tradition as the Aztec or Maya, it is difficult for historians to estimate population decline or any events after conquest. But, it is sometimes argued, and equally disputed among scholars that the Inca began to contract these diseases several years before the Spanish appeared in the region, as it was possibly carried to their empire by traders and travelers. The outbreak, argued to be hemorrhagic smallpox, reached the Andes in 1524. While numbers are unavailable, Spanish records indicate that the population was so devastated by disease that they could hardly resist the foreign forces.

Historians differ as to whether the illness of the 1520s was smallpox; a minority of scholars claim that the epidemic was due to an indigenous illness called Carrion's disease. In any case, a 1981 study by N. D. Cook shows that the Andes suffered from three separate population declines during colonization. The first was of 30–50 percent during the first outbreak of smallpox. When a measles outbreak occurred, there was another decline of 25–30 percent. Finally, when smallpox and measles epidemics occurred together, which occurred from 1585 to 1591, a decline of 30–60 percent occurred. Collectively these declines amounted to a decline of 93 percent from the pre-contact population in the Andes region. Mortality was particularly high among children, ensuring that the impact of the epidemics would extend to the next generation.

Another cause for the decline of the native population related to Spanish conquest is mercury intoxication and other health effects of mining. Instead of an instant effect on the native population, mercury intoxication had a steady but lethal role in population decline during and after colonization. Mercury poisoning was the cause of chronic diseases that would later affect native populations both physically and physiologically.

Beyond the devastation of the local populations by disease, they suffered considerable enslavement, pillaging and destruction from warfare. The Spanish took thousands of women from the local natives to use as servants and concubines. As Pizarro and his men took over portions of South America, they plundered and enslaved countless people. Some local populations entered into vassalage willingly, to defeat the Inca. Native groups such as the Huanca, Cañari, Chanka, and Chachapoya fought alongside the Spanish as they opposed Inca rule. The basic policy of the Spanish towards local populations was that voluntary vassalage would yield safety and coexistence, while continued resistance would result in more deaths and destruction.

Another significant effect on the people in South America was the spread of Christianity. As Pizarro and the Spanish subdued the continent and brought it under their control, they forcefully converted many to Christianity, claiming to have educated them in the ways of the "one true religion." With the depopulation of the local populations along with the capitulation of the Inca Empire, the Spanish missionary work after colonization began was able to continue unimpeded. While some historians claim it took just a generation for the entire continent to be under Christian influence, Indigenous religious traditions and syncretic practices have persisted into the present day. Colonial efforts to evangelize the Central Andes were met with a variety of responses, including acceptance, resistance, and revolt in the form of the Taki Unquy movement.

=== Environmental impact ===
The arrival of the Spanish also had an unexpected impact on the land itself. Recent research points out that the Spanish conquest altered Peru's shoreline. Before the Spaniards arrived, inhabitants of the arid northern Peruvian coast clad massive sandy ridges with an accidental form of "armor", millions of discarded mollusk shells, which protected the ridges from erosion for nearly 4700 years prior to the Spanish arrival, and produced a vast corrugated landscape that is visible from space. This incidental landscape protection came to a swift end, however, after diseases brought by Spanish colonists decimated the local population and after colonial officials resettled the survivors inland, without humans to create the protective covering, newly formed beach ridges simply eroded and vanished. According to archaeologist Torben Rick, parts of the northern coast of Peru may look completely natural and pristine, "but if you rewind the clock a couple of millennia, you see that people were actively shaping this land by creating beach ridge systems".

The shift to large-scale mining in the Andean highlands as a result of Spanish conquest also affected the environment. The center of highland mining was Potosí, which became the main source of silver in the world. Before the colonization of Potosí, the Inca Empire had mined silver in the region of Poroco, a town located to the south. However, in 1545 a native of the region of Cuzco discovered the large deposit of silver in what became known as Cerro Rico (Rich Hill). Eventually this information was brought to the Spaniard Juan de Villarroel who, with the help of seventy-five other Spaniards, formally founded Potosí in 1545. The discovery of Cerro Rico ultimately led to the Spanish emphasis on silver mining and production in the Andean highlands. With such a large reserve of silver, the Spaniards turned to the mercury amalgamation process to refine the silver ores and, increasingly, to the local mining of mercury. Records indicate that the mines in nearby Huancavelica generated between 50,600 metric tons to 51,300 tons of mercury during the colonial period. The environmental impact was significant. Large amounts of mercury were released into the atmosphere and local watersheds, affecting plants and animals throughout the region. Peru was not the only region affected as gaseous mercury was released during the refining process, eventually reaching as far as New Spain.

== In fiction ==
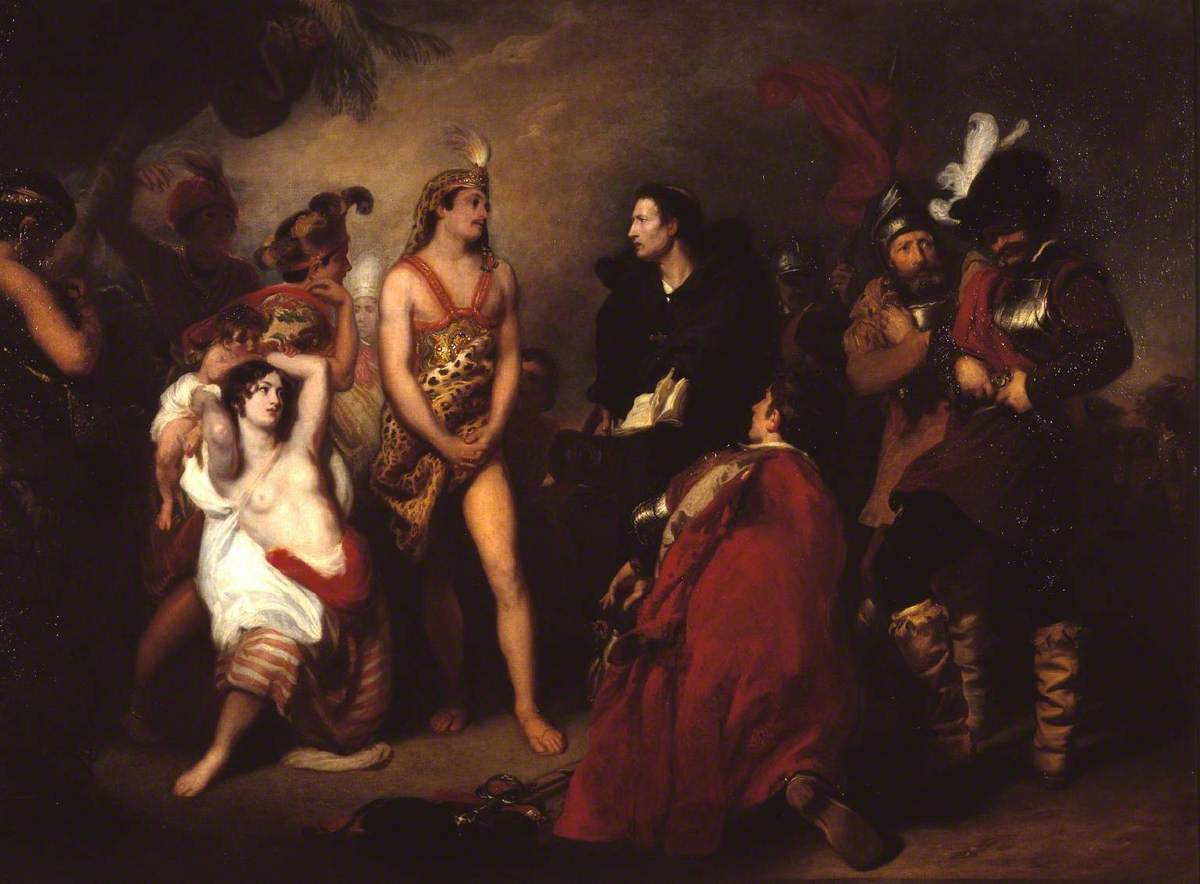
The First Interview Between the Spaniards and the Peruvians by Henry Perronet Briggs, 1827

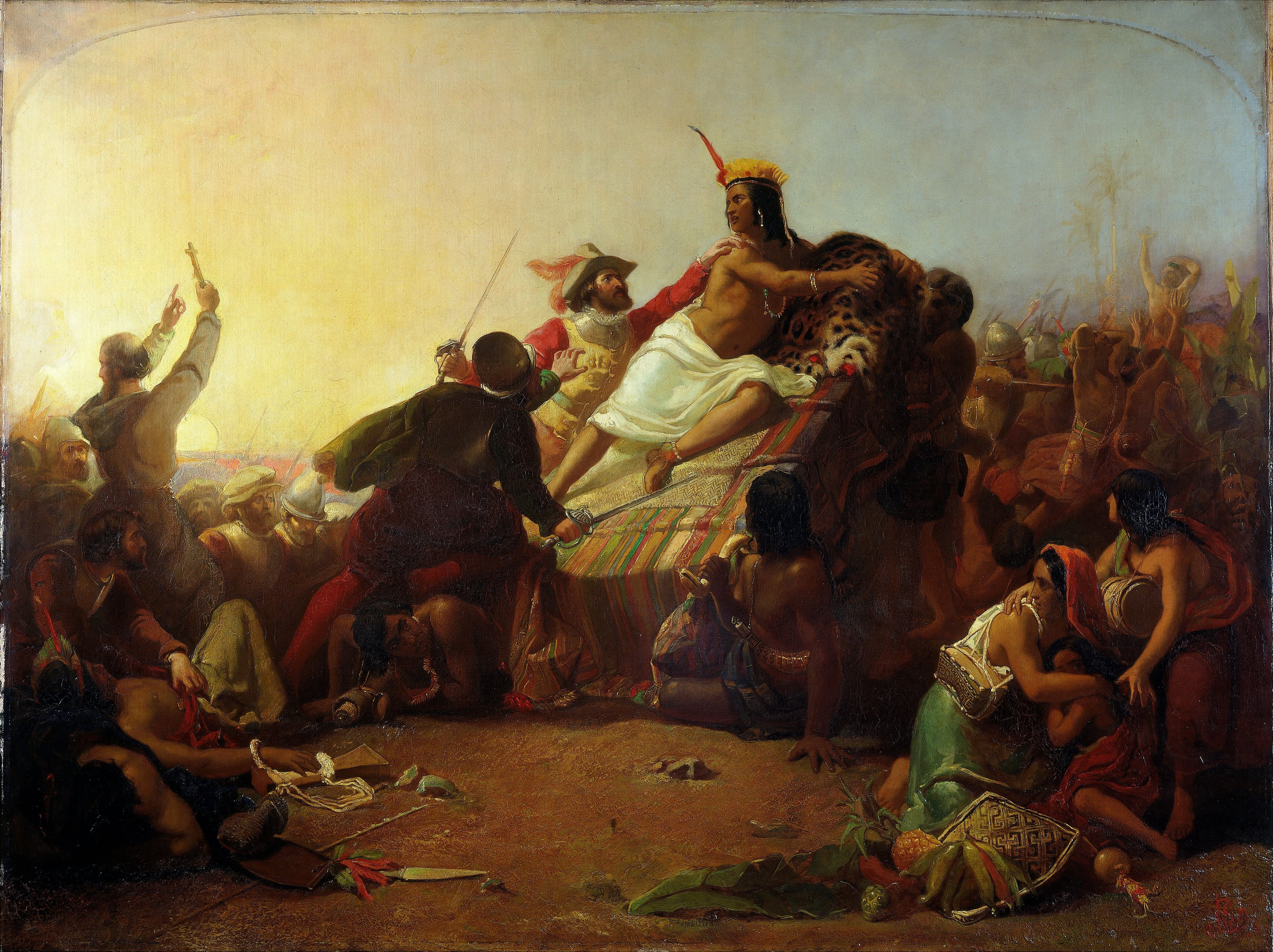
Pizarro Seizing the Inca of Peru by John Everett Millais, 1846

Marmontel's novel Les Incas, ou la destruction de l'empire du Perou (1777), inspired by Bartolomé de Las Casas's Account, tells a fictitious version of the conquest of Peru to portray the author's views on the religious fanaticism of the Conquistadors and their cruelty to the natives.

An opera of Verdi, Alzira (1845), is set during the Conquest. In the play, an Inca called Zamoro wants to find the princess Alzira, who has been engaged to the Conquistador Gusmano.

The second act of Rameau's Les Indes galantes (1735) is called Les incas du Pérou and tells the love story of a Spanish Conquistador and an Inca princess.

The Spanish Comedy La aurora en Copacabana, written by Pedro Calderón de la Barca, dramatizes the Conquest under a religious perspective, adding allegorical characters that represents the Idolatry and the Christian conversion of the Native Peruvians.

The first part of Madame de Graffigny's epistolary novel Lettres d'une Péruvienne narrates the abduction of Zilia, an Inca princess, by the Spaniards during the Conquest.

Peter Shaffer's play The Royal Hunt of the Sun (1964) dramatizes the conquest of the Incas. In the play, Pizarro, Atahualpa, Valverde and other historical figures appear as characters.

This event is also narrated as a Science Fiction novelette in Randall Garrett's Despoilers of the Golden Empire (1959).

The Ransom Room is the setting of the romance Das Gold von Caxamalca (1928) by German novelist Jakob Wasserman.

The conquest is also used as a starting point for the Matthew Reilly novel Temple, where the siege of Cusco is used. Many historical figures are mentioned, especially Pizarro who is mentioned as the pursuer of the protagonist.

The Inca are featured in the third Campaign in Age of Empires 3, having a Lost City hidden in the Andes. They are also in the Multiplayer, found primarily in the areas making up Chile and Argentina. In the Definitive Edition of the game they are a playable faction.

The conquest is parodied in The Simpsons TV series, in the episode "Lost Verizon", written by John Frink.

Pizarro and his fellow conquistadors feature as antagonists in the 1982 animated serial The Mysterious Cities of Gold.

== Quotes ==
I wish Your Majesty to understand the motive that moves me to make this statement is the peace of my conscience and because of the guilt I share. For we have destroyed by our evil behaviour such a government as was enjoyed by these natives. They were so free of crime and greed, both men and women, that they could leave gold or silver worth a hundred thousand pesos in their open house. So that when they discovered that we were thieves and men who sought to force their wives and daughters to commit sin with them, they despised us. But now things have come to such a pass in offence of God, owing to the bad example we have set them in all things, that these natives from doing no evil have turned into people who can do no good... I beg God to pardon me, for I am moved to say this, seeing that I am the last to die of the Conquistadors."

— Mansio Serra Leguizamon

When has it ever happened, either in ancient or modern times, that such amazing exploits have been achieved? Over so many climes, across so many seas, over such distances by land, to subdue the unseen and unknown? Whose deeds can be compared with those of Spain? Not even the ancient Greeks and Romans.

— Francisco Xeres, Report on the Discovery of Peru

When I set out to write for the people of today and of the future, about the conquest and discovery that our Spaniards made here in Peru, I could not but reflect that I was dealing with the greatest matters one could possibly write about in all of creation as far as secular history goes. Where have men ever seen the things they have seen here? And to think that God should have permitted something so great to remain hidden from the world for so long in history, unknown to men, and then let it be found, discovered and won all in our own time!

— Pedro Cieza de León, Chronicles of Peru

The houses are more than two hundred paces in length, and very well built, being surrounded by strong walls, three times the height of a man. The roofs are covered with straw and wood, resting on the walls. The interiors are divided into eight rooms, much better built than any we had seen before. Their walls are of very well cut stones and each lodging is surrounded by its masonry wall with doorways, and has its fountain of water in an open court, conveyed from a distance by pipes, for the supply of the house. In front of the plaza, towards the open country, a stone fortress is connected with it by a staircase leading from the square to the fort. Towards the open country there is another small door, with a narrow staircase, all within the outer wall of the plaza. Above the town, on the mountain side, where the houses commence, there is another fort on a hill, the greater part of which is hewn out of the rock. This is larger than the other, and surrounded by three walls, rising spirally.

— Francisco Xeres, Massacre, Gold and Civil War

== See also ==
- Ancient Peru
- Encomiendas in Peru
- Habsburg Spain
- History of Peru
- Inca society
- Indian reductions in the Andes
- Paititi
- Pambokancha, an Inca religious site
- Reductions
- List of wars by death toll
- Spanish conquest of the Aztec Empire
- Spanish conquest of the Maya
- Spanish conquest of the Muisca
- Spanish conquest of Yucatán
- European colonization of the Americas
- Spanish conquest of Guatemala
- Conquest of Chile

== Bibliography ==
- Bauer, Brian S. (1991). "Pacariqtambo and the Mythical Origins of the Inca". Latin American Antiquity. 2 (1): 7–26. doi:10.2307/971893. JSTOR 971893. S2CID 163333842.
- Betanzos, Juan de (1996). Hamilton, Roland; Buchanan, Dana (eds.). Narrative of the Incas. Austin: University of Texas Press. ISBN 978-0-292-75560-4.
- Covey, R. Alan (2000). "Inka Administration of the Far South Coast of Peru". Latin American Antiquity. 11 (2): 119–38. doi:10.2307/971851. JSTOR 971851. S2CID 164195422.
- Gibson, Charles (1978). "Conquest, Capitulation, and Indian Treaties". The American Historical Review. 83 (1): 1–15. doi:10.2307/1865900. JSTOR 1865900.
- Hemming, John (1970). Conquest of the Incas. New York: Harcourt. ISBN 978-0-15-122560-6.
- Innes, Hammond (1969). Conquistadors. New York: Alfred A. Knopf. OCLC 23083.
- Kubler, George (1945). "The Behavior of Atahualpa, 1531–1533". The Hispanic American Historical Review. 25 (4): 413–27. doi:10.2307/2508231. JSTOR 2508231.
- Kubler, George (1947). "The Neo-Inca State (1537–1572)". The Hispanic American Historical Review. 27 (2): 189–203. doi:10.2307/2508415. JSTOR 2508415.
- Lockhart, James (1994). Spanish Peru, 1532-1560: a social history (2nd ed.). Madison: University of Wisconsin Press. ISBN 978-0-299-14163-9.
- Lockhart, James (1972). The men of Cajamarca: a social and biographical study of the first conquerors of Peru. Latin American monographs. Austin; London: Inst. of Latin American Studies by the University of Texas Press. ISBN 978-0-292-75001-2.
- Lovell, W. George (1992). "'Heavy Shadows and Black Night': Disease and Depopulation in Colonial Spanish America". Annals of the Association of American Geographers. 82 (3): 426–43. doi:10.1111/j.1467-8306.1992.tb01968.x.
- Macquarrie, Kim (2007). The Last Days of the Incas. New York: Simon and Schuster. ISBN 978-0-7432-6049-7.
- Means, Philip A. (1932). Fall of the Inca Empire and the Spanish Rule in Peru, 1530–1780. New York: Charles Scribner's Sons. OCLC 716374563.
- Newson, Linda A. (1985). "Indian Population Patterns in Colonial Spanish America". Latin American Research Review. 20 (3): 41–74. doi:10.1017/S0023879100021695. JSTOR 2503469. S2CID 202896817.
- Seed, Patricia (1991). "'Failing to Marvel': Atahualpa's Encounter with the Word". Latin American Research Review. 26 (1): 7–32. doi:10.1017/S0023879100034907. S2CID 252949347.
- Wachtel, Nathan (1977). The vision of the vanquished: the Spanish conquest of Peru through Indian eyes, 1530–1570. Translated by Reynolds, Ben; Reynolds, Sian. Hassocks: The Harvester Press. ISBN 978-0-85527-119-0.
- Ward, Thomas (2008). Formation of Latin American Nations. From Late Antiquity to Early Modernity. Norman: University of Oklahoma Press. ISBN 9780806161501.
