= Griego =

Griego is a surname. Notable people with the surname include:

- Eric Griego (born 1966), American politician
- Jorge Griego (1504–after 1545), Greek conquistador
- Phil Griego (1948–2026), American politician

== See also ==
- Grego (surname)
- Juan Griego, city in Venezuela
