= Francisco Xerez =

Spanish explorer, historian and personal secretary of conquistador Francisco Pizarro

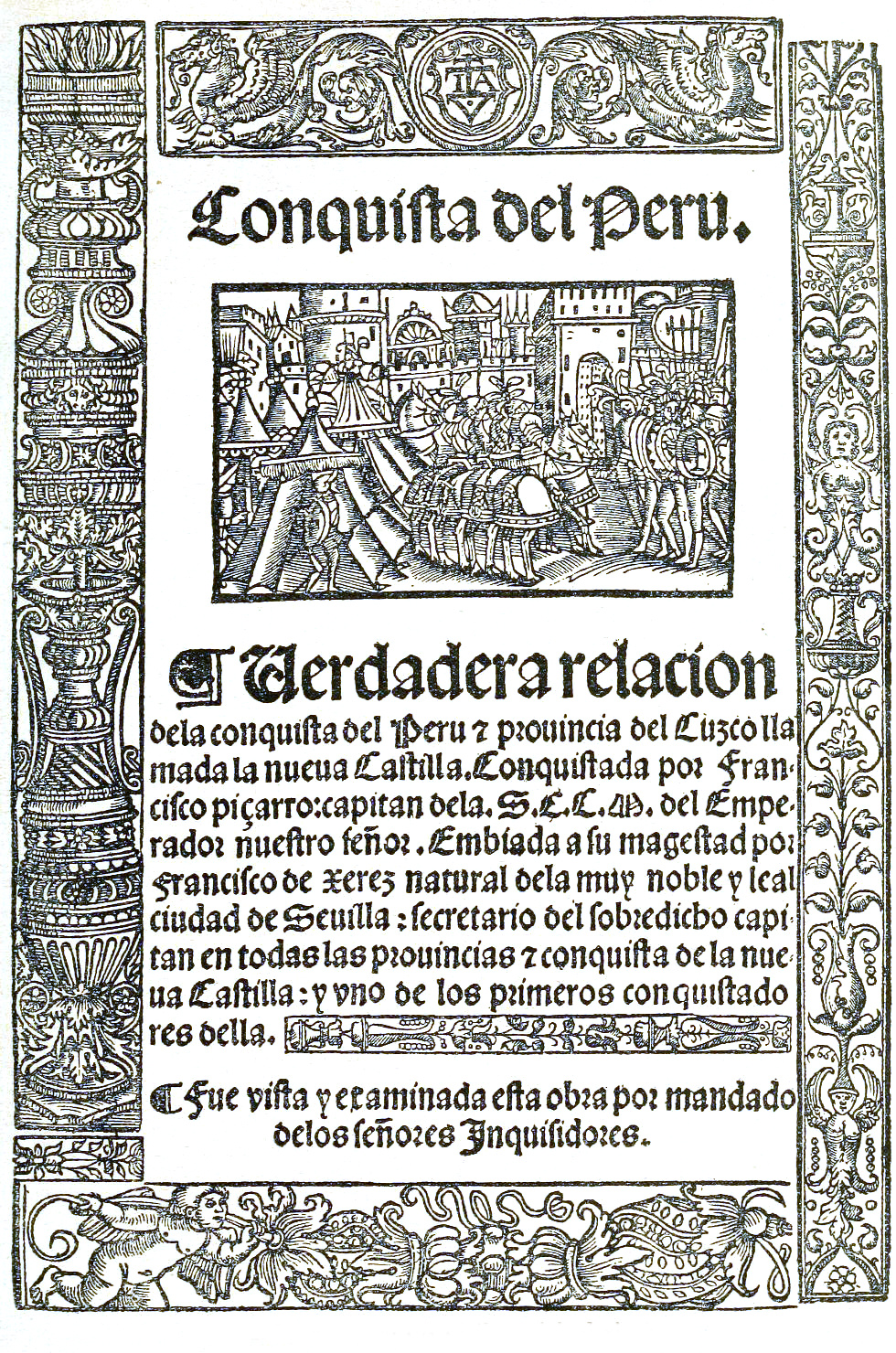
Cover of Conquista del Peru (1547)

Francisco Xerez, Francisco de Jerez, or Francisco de Xerxes (1495–1565?) was a Spanish explorer-turned-historian, the personal secretary of conquistador Francisco Pizarro. He participated in the conquest of Peru during the first two unsuccessful expeditions led by Pizarro, Diego de Almagro and Hernando de Luque in 1524. Xerez did not stay and join The thirteen of the fame in the Isle of Gallo (1526).

Francisco Xerez was born in Seville, Spain. He arrived in the New World in 1514 as a member of the expedition that Ferdinand II of Aragon had sent under the guidance of Pedrarias Dávila. The expedition had landed in the city of Santa María la Antigua del Darién, Panama. During the next decade, he remained in Castilla de Oro. Xerez explored the Isthmus of Panama along with Vasco Nuñez de Balboa and Gaspar de Espinosa. As one of the first settlers in Acla, Panama, he became the actuary of the local Spanish administrators.

Between 1528 and 1530, Xerez lived in Natá of the Coclé Province as the actuary of governor Pedro de los Ríos. During this last year, when Francisco Pizarro had returned from his interview with King Charles V in Toledo, Spain, Xerez once again joined Pizarro and his followers on their voyage to conquer the Inca Empire.

Following the successful campaign of the Battle of Cajamarca in 1532, Francisco Pizarro designated Xerez as his personal secretary and offered him a significant amount of gold the Inca Emperor Atahualpa had paid as a ransom. Xerez wrote with all detail about the events that preceded the Spanish conquest and the first encounter Pizarro had with Atahualpa in Cajamarca. During this time Xerez fractured one of his legs and returned to Seville, where his narrations about the conquest of Peru were published as the "Verdadera Relación de la conquista del Perú" in June 1534.

Xerez did not have the same luck back in his native Seville, and soon became broke after various unsuccessful businesses. Towards the end of the 1540s his situation aggravated, prompting him to change his name to Francisco López de Xerez. No details of Xerez are known following these years, although some authors claim he went bankrupt and eventually returned with his family to Peru until he died.
