= Bartolomé Ruiz =

Spanish conquistador

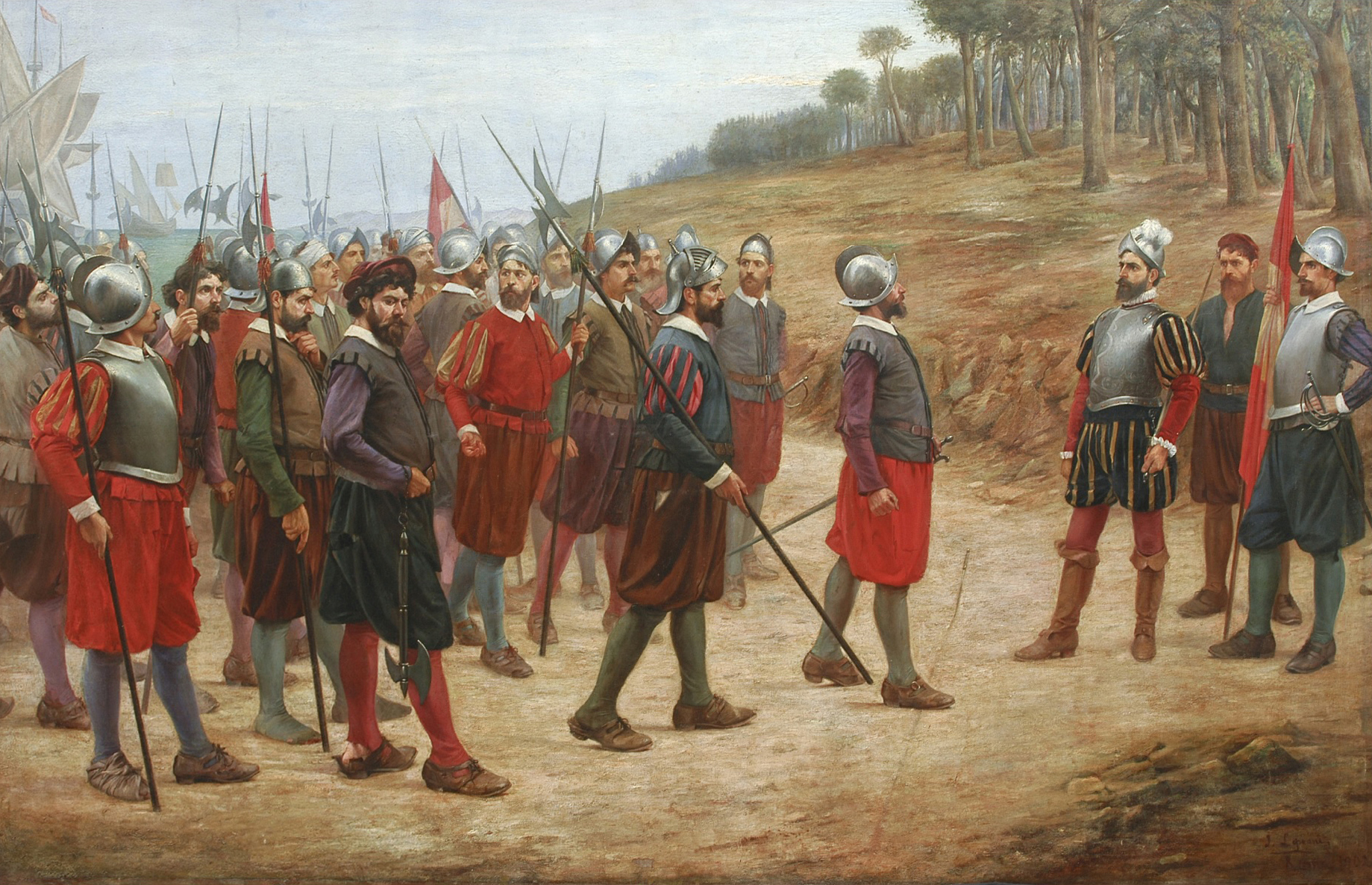
- Born: c. 1482; Moguer, Crown of Castile
- Died: 1532 (aged 49–50); Cajamarca, Peru, Spanish Empire
- Known for: Conquest of Peru; Discovery of Ecuador
- Title: Oil painting by Juan Lepiani; Francisco Pizarro on the Isle del Gallo, drawing a line in the sand for the Famous Thirteen

Bartolomé Ruiz (c. 1482 in Moguer, Spain – c. 1532 in Cajamarca, Peru), also known as Bartolomé Ruiz de Estrada, was a Spanish conquistador. He started his career as Christopher Columbus's pilot, before joining Francisco Pizarro and Diego de Almagro on their conquest of Peru. Ruiz was a member of the Famous Thirteen. He is also the first European to see Ecuador, and the first to land and begin European exploration there.

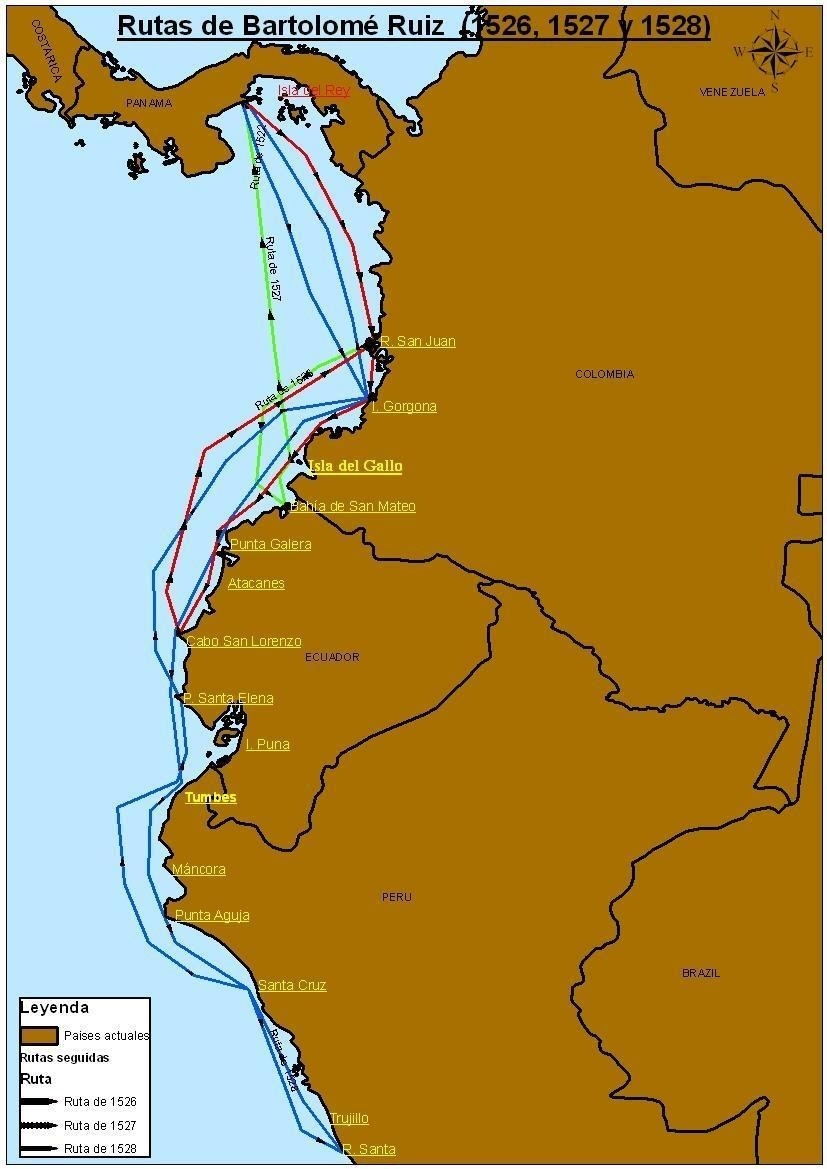
Bartolomé Ruiz's voyages

== Career ==
Ruiz's first known job in the Americas was piloting for Lorenzo de Aldana, exploring the coastal regions of Panama. In 1524 he piloted for Francisco Pizarro and Diego de Almagro and their army of 160 men, invading Colombia. Ruiz fought Indians alongside Almagro when Almagro lost his eye to an arrow.

Ruiz next sailed to Ecuador, becoming the first European to explore the Santiago River, Puma Lagartos, Point Oysters, the islands of Corcovado, and Cape San Francisco – named in honor of Pizarro. He continued on to the nose of Jamaica, the tip Palmar, and the town of San Juan de Coaques.

When Pizarro drew his famous line in the sand at Isla del Gallo, Bartolomé Ruiz was the first of the famous thirteen to cross the line. He piloted the expedition that established the "Nueva Valencia" fort in September 1527 at Tumbes.

On July 26, 1529, Pizarro signed the capitulation with the Holy Roman Emperor Charles V in Toledo. It awarded Bartolomé Ruiz the title and honors, "Hidalgo, Knight of the Golden Spur, Pilot of the South Sea," and a salary of 75,000 maravedis per year, and perpetual Regent of Tumbes. He also won the title of Clerk of Tumbes for his children.

After the Incan Emperor Atahualpa was captured at Cajamarca in 1532, Ruiz arrived with three ships to reinforce the Spanish. In Cajamarca he caught fever and died quickly at the age of 50.
