= Francisco Chilche =

- Anonymous Cañari chieftain at the Corpus Christi procession in Cusco.

Kuraka of the Cañari
- Reign: Unknown-1586
- Successor: Hernando Guatanaula
- Born: c. 1497
- Died: 1586
- Issue: Hernando Guatanaula

Chilche (c. 1497–1586) was a kuraka of the Cañari tribe. He was a courtier of Inca emperor Huayna Capac, surviving the civil war between his successor Huáscar and Atahualpa before allying with Spanish conquistador Francisco Pizarro. He converted to Christianity under the name of Francisco Zaraunanta Chilche Cañar, or simply Francisco Chilche, and became Pizarro's leading native supporter, eventually becoming governor of the Sacred Valley of Yucay. Although obscure in modern historiography, he has been deemed one of the most powerful kuraka of Peruvian history.

== Early life ==
According to mestizo chronicler Inca Garcilaso de la Vega, who knew him personally, Chilche was a prince of the Cañari, a tribe that served as the royal guard for the Inca emperor Huayna Capac, which secured the young Chilche a position at the imperial court as a page to Huayna. Details regarding his career prior to Pizarro's arrival in 1533 remain obscure, though it is reasonable to assume that while he retained his royal status, he secretly opposed then new emperor Atahualpa, who had seized the throne from Huayna's heir, his own brother Huáscar. Atahualpa had brutally punished the Cañari people for supporting Huáscar; chronicles additionally imply Atahualpa was preparing to carry out the wholesale extermination and resettlement of the Cañari lands just as Pizarro arrived.

== Biography ==
=== Spanish conquest ===
Chilche welcomed the conquistador in route to Cusco and pledged himself at his service in 1534. Pizarro arrived at the back of a strategic alliance with the Cañari of Tumbes, whose chieftain Vilchumlay had accompanied him since the beginning and witnessed the capture of Atahualpa, although Pizarro had subsequently sent him and Sebastián de Belalcázar to secure the Piura region. Upon asking which of the Spaniards was the captain general, Chilche proclaimed to Pizarro, "I come to serve you, and I will not forsake the Christians until I die," as recorded in the chronicle of Diego de Trujillo.

He became a close collaborator of Pizarro, serving as the conquistador's bodyguard and helping to drive off the Atahualpist forces of Quizquiz when they attempted to block their advance on Cusco. His knowledge of Inca politics was also vital for Pizarro, as Chilche at the time was the leader of a Cusco-based faction of Cañari and Chachapoya noblemen. His influence over the pro-Spanish indigenous forces was so significant that the Inca nobles claimed the whole Cañari people had allied with the Spanish solely due to the friendship between Chilche and Pizarro. He also acted as the intermediary to introduce Manco Inca, at the time a political ally, to the Spanish. Acting as a general of indian auxiliaries in Pizarro's army, Chilche distinguished himself particularly in the battle against Chalcuchima, whom Chilche defeated and put to flight at Jauja.

=== Revolt of Manco Inca ===
Chilche's true moment of distinction came during the 1536 Siege of Cusco against the forces of Manco Inca, who had turned against the Spaniards in an attempt to seize the former Inca Empire. Fighting alongside Hernando, Gonzalo, and Juan Pizarro, his Cañari warriors were instrumental in repelling assaults on the city, extinguishing fires and dismantling fortifications erected by the besiegers.

During the siege, one of Manco's captains approached the walls of the Spanish stronghold to issue a challenge to a duel of champions. Hernando Pizarro ordered that the duel be refused, deeming it too great a risk to Spanish morale and of little strategic importance, but Chilche requested and received permission to fight on their behalf. He armed himself with a chuqui (lance) and a champí (an axe-bladed mace) and fought the Inca, grappling at close quarters several times, until the Pizarrist finally killed his rival with a spear thrust and decapitated him to claim his head. The Spanish acclaimed Chilche for the victory, while the Inca considered it a bad omen due to the Cañari having been previously an ethnicity despised under Inca rule.

The siege was lifted shortly thereafter with the arrival of reinforcements led by Diego de Almagro, alongside the promise of another army brought by Alonso de Alvarado from Lima, which Manco Inca's forces had also failed to besiege. Along with the favors Pizarro bestowed upon Chilche, the victory secured the loyalty of the remaining Cañari groups who had not yet aligned with Pizarro; until then, they had avoided clearly committing to any side in order to wait to see which would take the advantage during the conquest.

For his political and military prowess, Chilche was rewarded with the rich Sacred Valley of Yucay, replacing the former Atahualpist governor, Huallpa Túpac. Although ownership of the valley was retained by Pizarro, and later to his mestizo son Gonzalo, its administrative control was ceded to Chilche, facilitating a meteoric rise in the Cañari's economic and political power. Chilche was de facto one of the most powerful men in the Inca Empire under Spanish rule. Together with his wife and his two sons, Hernando and Juan Bautista, Chilche established a virtually feudal order there, attracting a following of select natives through tax exemptions, land grants, and the acceptance of women from their families as concubines. His power also held added symbolic significance, as Yucay had been traditionally ruled by the royal panaka of Huayna Cápac.

=== Civil wars ===
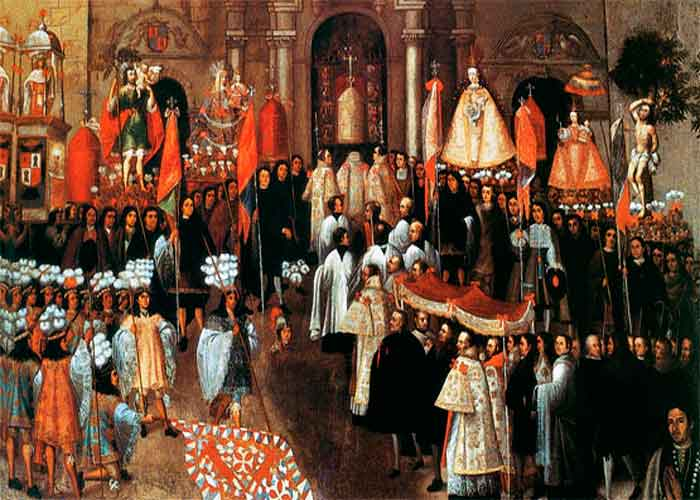
Corpus Christi in Cuzco, with the Cañari parade at the left.

Chilche did not participate directly in the civil war against Diego de Almagro, although he likely supported the Pizarrist faction despite the blow deatl dealt by the assassination of Francisco Pizarro. The Cañari also appears to have remained on the sidelines during the subsequent Great Rebellion of the Encomenderos led by Gonzalo Pizarro.

In 1548, after the end of the Great Rebellion, Chilche was sued by García Quispi Capi, a descendant of the deposed Huallpa Túpac. After two years of litigation, Chilche was forced to grant control of the local ayllus to Quispi Capi, while retaining the mitimaes and the official title of governor for himself. However, the Cañari leader subsequently went back on his word, gathered an army and seized by force the lands he had given away, sparking numerous complaints from both the valley's inhabitants and the Spanish administration. It was only through the progressive regularization of the Spanish rule, particularly by the efforts of Pedro de la Gasca, that further abuses were prevented. Chilche's near-absolute power gradually declined, although he retained his prominent status.

In 1553, the uprising led by Francisco Hernández Girón took place, resulting in the occupation of the Cusco area. Dragged into the conflict when the war reached their territories, Chilche's subjects were accused by Inca Garcilaso of opportunism and duplicity, reportedly assisting both sides of the conflict in secret depending on which held the advantage at the time. Nevertheless, the assistance provided by the Cañaris and Chachapoyas of Huamanga proved vital to restore order, as they informed the authorities of Girón's hiding place, leading to his arrest. Chilche was never accused of aiding the rebellion in case he had done so.

=== Politics ===
During the native parade of Corpus Christi of June 1555, Chilche starred in a notorious incident highlighting the political tensions between Inca and Cañari factions. He arrived in a litter decorated with scenes of his wartime exploits, after which he shed his outer robes to reveal he was dressed for combat, and brandished by the hair the shrunken head of the Inca killed in 1537, which he showed to the crowd. The stunt, clearly intended to showcase his experience as a Spanish ally while simultaneously offending the Inca elites present, provoked four noblemen into attacking him, knocking him down from his place and sparking a large brawl.

The brawl was particularly scandalous because the Cañaris, as long-standing Pizarrist allies exempt from taxation, functioned essentially as a police force within the Spanish-ruled Inca realm, yet the Incas present had assaulted and attacked their most prominent representative. When the authorities separated the parties, the Incas accused Chilche of reigniting forgotten conflicts solely for personal gain, reminding him that the Cañaris had once been subjects of the Incas, while he defended himself by reminding them of his current position. Nevertheless, the teniente de corregidor or deputy magistrate Juan Luis de Monjaraz reprimanded Chilche for the stunt and confiscated the head, warning him not to incite the population again on pain of punishment, though he took no further action against him.

Despite the disturbance, Chilche's regional power did not diminish. That same year, he received a lucrative commission to replant and tend the timber forests in the Chian area, and five years later, Viceroy Andrés Hurtado de Mendoza appointed him mayor and chief of constables of the parroquia of Nuestra Señora de Santa Ana.

=== War against Vilcabamba and death ===
In 1558, Sayri Túpac was installed as new kuraka of Yucay as a consequence of political changes in the Spanish crown, but he died suddenly, after which Chilche was accused of murdering him with poison to recover his domains. He spent one year in prison between trials, being ultimately freed in absence of evidence, although chroniclers Inca Garcilaso and Felipe Guaman Poma de Ayala believed he was guilty. Chilche then forced the late Sayri's favorite concubine, Inés Coya, to marry him.

This was followed by a military campaign in 1571 against Túpac Amaru, the leader of the rebel Neo-Inca State of Vilcabamba, due to the assassination of the Spanish ambassador Atilano de Anaya and several indigenous leaders. Viceroy Francisco de Toledo, whom Chilche was close to, recruited him as captain of indigenous warriors, a role he shared with Francisco Cayo Topa, a cousin of Manco Inca who had allied with Spain. The contingent, under the general command of Martín Hurtado de Arbieto and maestre de campo Juan Álvarez Maldonado, fought its way through the mountain passes toward Vilcabamba. Although the Vilcabambans employed scorched earth tactics, a Spanish force led by Martín García Óñez de Loyola and the two native captains managed to break through, storm the rebels' final defenses and capture Túpac Amaru. After the victory, the lands of Vilcabamba were distributed among the participants, including the Cañari, while Chilche, who was a widower at the time, was given the rebel aristocrat Paula Cusichuarcay in marriage.

Chilche died in 1586, whereupon his son Hernando Guatanaula, the eldest of eight siblings, inherited the Yucay estate. Four of his other children. Alonso Marca Gualpa, Francisca Toro Gualpa, Francisco Chilquechuc, and Gonzalo Marca, also became notable figures.

== Bibliography ==
- Arana Bustamante, L. (2009) Un incidente en la vida de Francisco Chilche, kuraka del valle de Yucay (1555). Investigaciones sociales, Vol.13 N°23, pp. 171–186
- Caballero Ares, J. (2024) Los indios conquistadores aliados del Perú: el caso de don Francisco Chilche Cañar, cacique, alcalde y capitán del rey. Revista de Historia Militar, I extraordinario de 2024, pp. 83–154. ISSN 0482-5748
- Rostworowski, María (2016). Mujer y poder en los Andes coloniales. Instituto de Estudios Peruanos. ISBN 9789972515989.
- Wachtel, Nathan (2017). Sociedad e ideología: Ensayos de historia y antropología andinas. Instituto de Estudios Peruanos. ISBN 9789972516702.
