= Jorge Griego =

Greek conquistador (c. 1504-c.1545)

Jorge Griego (English: "George the Greek"; c. 1504 – after 1545) was a Greek-born conquistador who participated in the conquest of Peru. Jorge was born in 1504 in as a Greek (it is not clear what political unit he was born in) and followed his Greek friend Pedro De Candia to Panama and Peru. He was also appointed as an encomendero in Jauja, an authority which was granted mostly to Conquistadors.

== Life ==
Jorge Griego was born in Greece in about 1504, he later moved into Spain and from there he went to Panama in 1527 by following his friend Pedro De Candia who was a famous Greek Conquistador and commander of the artillery in Peru. Under the services of Francisco Pizarro in 1532 he took part in the battle of Cajamarca as a footman, against the forces of the Inca emperor Atahualpa. For his services in the battle of Cajamarca he received a share of the treasures of Cuzco which was the capital of the Inca Empire. There were many Greeks amongst the Spaniards who served as soldiers and especially as artillerymen, in the conquest of the New World. Jorge later became a resident in the city of Jauja in Peru and was appointed there as an encomendero, he later moved to Lima. In 1545, when the forces of Viceroy Blasco Nunez Vela pushed far to the north, outside the limits of Peru and had no one to manufacture gunpowder, Jorge Griego took over the task, though it was not his profession and went on a few years later to make large quantities of gunpowder during the Gasca campaign.

Finally, Jorge Griego left Peru and returned to Spain and settled in Seville's maritime district of Triana.

== See also ==
- Pedro de Candia
