= Diego Vilchumlay =

Kuraka of the Cañari
- Reign: Unknown-1566
- Successor: Francisco Ymbay
- Born: Unknown
- Died: 1566
- Issue: Francisco Ymbay

Vilchumlay (unknown-1566) was a kuraka of the Cañari tribe, later an ally of Spanish conquistador Francisco Pizarro. He was the first native chieftain to receive and support Pizarro in his grand entrance into the Inca Empire, making possible his alliance to many other native factions and ultimately the conquest of the territory. He converted to Christianity under the name of Diego Vilchumlay.

== Spanish conquest of the Inca Empire ==
Vilchumlay was chieftain of Gualaceo, from where he witnessed the punitive actions of Emperor Atahualpa against the Cañari provinces for supporting his rival and brother Huáscar, legitimate heir to Emperor Huayna Cápac. In 1532, ambitioning freedom from Atahualpa's brutal rule and revenge for his attacks, Vilchumaly and other notables to receive and ally with Pizarro, whom he had notice of from his previous voyage to the Inca Empire in 1526. They signed their alliance in Tumbes. Pizarro initiated his journey to the core of Inca Empire with the Cañaris to his side, concluding in capture of Atahualpa in Cajamarca, where Vilchumlay and other chieftains were present.

Pizarro sent Vilchumlay with Sebastián de Belalcázar to secure the port of San Miguel de Piura, where he had left 40 soldiers to recover from wounds and illnesses while waiting for reinforcements. The conquistador was also in the need of contact them to prevent them from scattering and initiating unauthorized conquests. Meanwhile, Pizarro continued to Cusco, where he was received by the other main Cañari player, Chilche. Thanks to the contacts established by Vilchumlay between Spaniards and Cañaris, Chilche joined Pizarro's circle as his advisor, bodyguard and champion. Vilchumlay also converted to Christianity adding Diego to his name, and took part in the conquest of Quito.

Diego Vilchumlay served in the Hispanic side during the conquest of the territories still held by former general of Atahualpa, like Lita and Quilca, and had an outstanding role during the revolt of Manco Inca. Manco's lieutenant Quizu Yupanqui besieged Lima in August 1536, to which Diego de Sandoval and Vilchumlay answered gathering a Cañari relief army. The news of their arrival drove Yupanqui to lift the siege. At some point, he also fought the Saraguros of Loja and served in the conquest of Carumas. In 1554 he was among the Cañari captains recruited by Rodrigo de Salazar.

He maintained a high status in the Spanish rule, even after the inevitable shifts brought by the new administration. He was rewarded for his service with the territories of El Pan, Toctesí and Hazmal, and his name is recorded in the foundation of Cuenca, in the ancient Cañari center of Tomebamba and close to his own domains. He died in 1666, being succeeded by his son Francisco Ymbay.

== Sources ==
- Caballero Ares, J. (2024). Los indios conquistadores aliados del Perú: el caso de don Francisco Chilche Cañar, cacique, alcalde y capitán del rey. Revista de Historia Militar, I extraordinario de 2024, pp. 83-154. ISSN: 0482-5748
- Espinoza Soriano, Waldemar (2021). Etnias del imperio de los incas: reinos, señoríos, curacazgos y cacicatos. Universidad Ricardo Palma. ISBN 9786124419577.
- Oberem, U. (1974). Los Cañaris y la conquista española de la Sierra ecuatoriana, otro capítulo de las relaciones interétnicas en el siglo XVI. Journal de la Société des américanistes, vol. 63 (1974-1976), pp. 263-274.
