= Famous Thirteen =

Group of Spanish conquistadors of the 1520s

Coordinates: 2°00′N 78°39′W

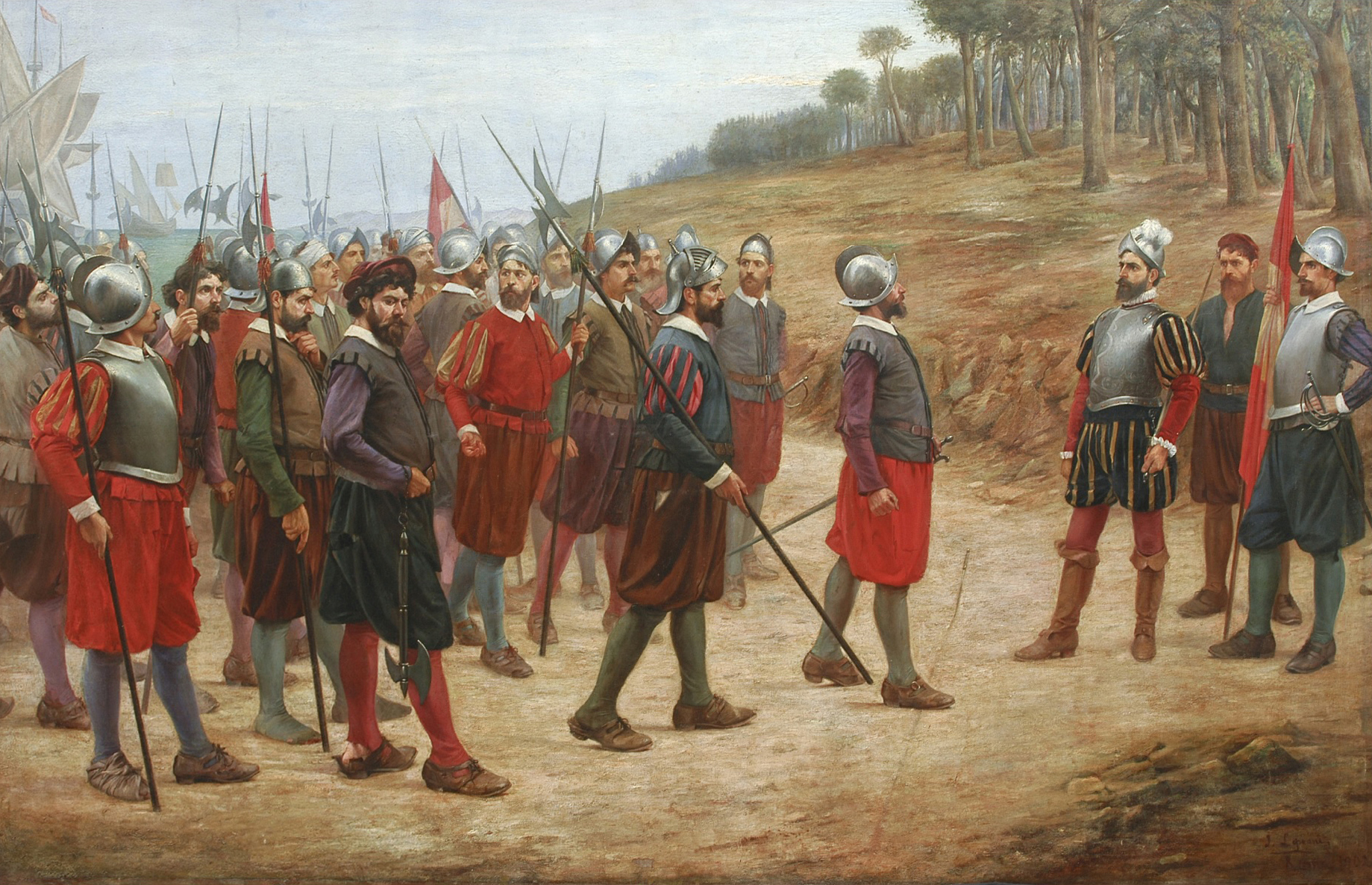
Oil painting by Juan Lepiani; Francisco Pizarro on the Isle del Gallo, drawing a line in the sand for the Famous Thirteen

The Famous Thirteen (Spanish Los trece de la fama, "the thirteen of the fame", or Los trece de Gallo, "the thirteen of [Isla del] Gallo") were a group of 16th century Spanish conquistadors that participated in the Spanish conquest of Peru (second expedition) along with their leader, Francisco Pizarro. In 1527 Pizarro and his men were waiting on the Isla del Gallo, in bad conditions, when the supply ship returned from Panama, commanded by Juan Tafur with orders from the Spanish governor to abandon the expedition. According to the traditional version of the story, Pizarro drew a line in the sand with his sword and said, "those on that side of the line can go back to Panama and be poor; those on this side can come to Peru and be rich. Let the good Castillian choose his path." In the traditional telling of the story, only thirteen men chose to stay with Pizarro.

Historians have noted inconsistencies in reports of the identity of the Famous Thirteen, and have identified as many as nineteen candidates for the thirteen spots.

One list of names is as follows:

- Nicolás de Ribera "el Viejo", born in Olvera, Andalucía;
- Cristóbal de Peralta, hidalgo of Baeza, Andalucia;
- Antón de Carrión, born in Carrión de los Condes;
- Pedro de Candia, a Greek born in the Kingdom of Candia, Crete, then part of the Republic of Venice;
- Domingo de Soraluce, or Soria Lucina, a Basque merchant from Bergara;
- Francisco de Cuéllar, from Cuellar;
- Joan de la Torre y Díaz Chacón, born in Villagarcía de la Torre de Extremadura, near Llerena;
- Pedro de Alcón, from Cazalla de la Sierra north of Seville;
- García de Jeréz or Jaren, Utrera merchant
- Alonso de Briceño, born about 1506 in Benavente;
- Alonso de Molina, born in Úbeda;
- Gonzalo Martín de Trujillo, born in Trujillo;
- Martín de Paz.

Also, the "brave pilot" Bartolomé Ruiz, born in Moguer.

== Aftermath ==
The Capitulacion of 1529, made Ruiz Grand Pilot of the Southern Ocean, while Candia was placed at the head of artillery, and the remaining eleven "were created hidalgos and cavalleros.

== See also ==
- The Nine Worthies are known in Spanish as los nueve de la fama.
