= Battle of Cajamarca =

1532 battle during the Spanish conquest of the Inca Empire

Capture of Atahualpa
- Part of the Spanish conquest of Peru
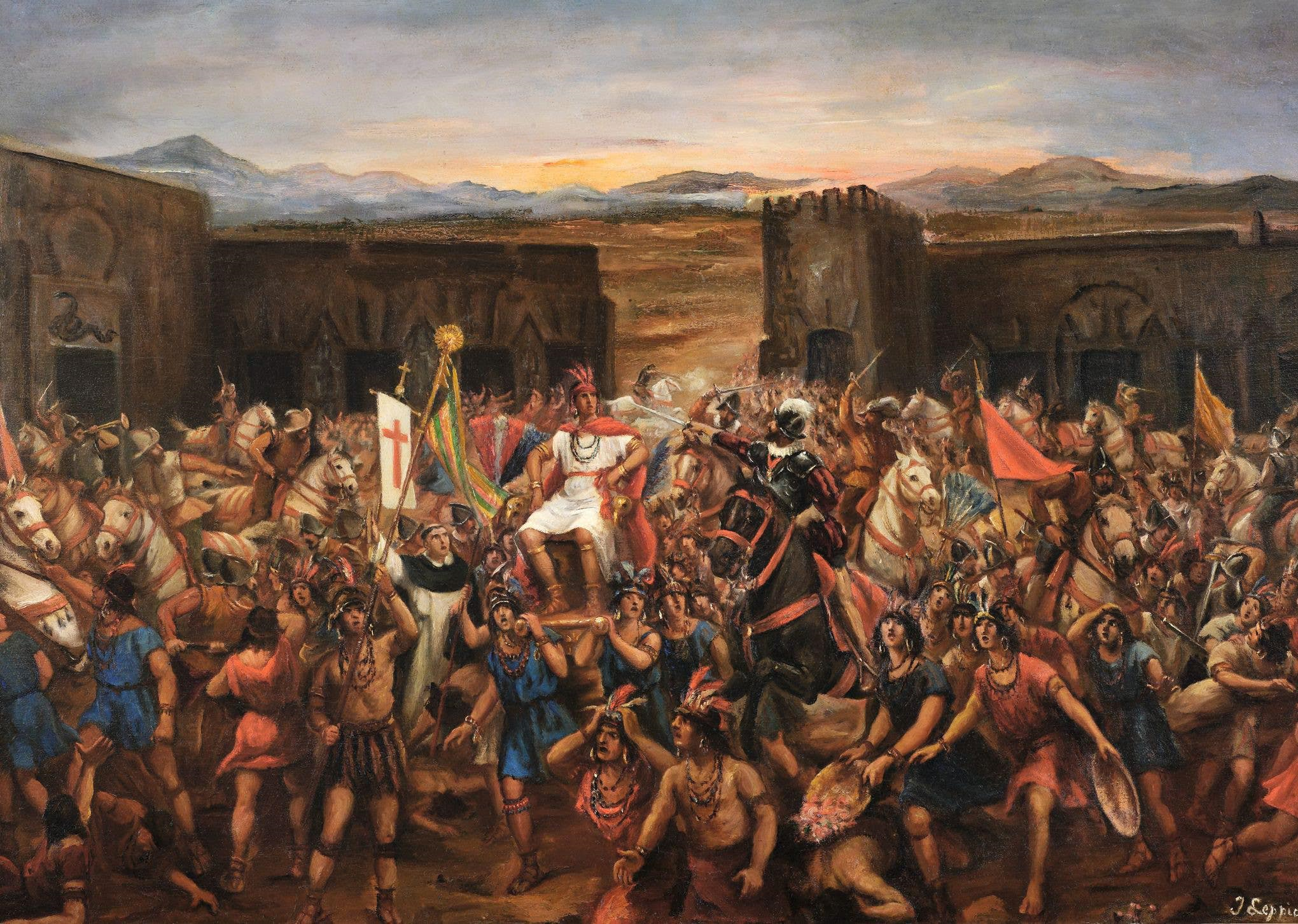
- Painting by Juan Lepiani depicting the capture of Atahualpa in Cajamarca.
Date	November 16, 1532
Location	Cajamarca, Peru 7°09′25″S 78°31′03″W
Result	Spanish victory
Territorial changes	Capture of Atahualpa; Fall of the Inca Empire

Belligerents
Spanish Empire	Inca Empire

Commanders and leaders
Francisco Pizarro (WIA); Hernando Pizarro; Hernando de Soto	Atahualpa (POW)

Strength
106 infantry 62 cavalry four cannons 12 harquebuses	3,000–8,000 guards

Casualties and losses
1 slave dead; one wounded	2,000–3,000 killed 7,000 captured
- Location within Peru Battle of Cajamarca (South America) Battle of Cajamarca (America)

The Battle of Cajamarca, also spelled Cajamalca (though many contemporary scholars prefer to call it the Cajamarca massacre), was the ambush and seizure of the Incan ruler Atahualpa by a small Spanish force led by Francisco Pizarro, on November 16, 1532. The Spanish killed thousands of Atahualpa's counselors, commanders, and unarmed attendants in the great plaza of Cajamarca, and caused his armed host outside the town to flee. The capture of Atahualpa marked the opening stage of the conquest of the pre-Columbian civilization of Peru.

== Background ==
The confrontation at Cajamarca was the culmination of a months-long struggle involving espionage, subterfuge, and diplomacy between Pizarro and the Inca via their respective envoys. Atahualpa had received the invaders from a position of immense strength. Encamped along the heights of Cajamarca with a large force of nearly 80,000 battle-tested troops fresh from their victories in the civil war against his half-brother Huáscar, the Inca felt they had little to fear from Pizarro's tiny army, however exotic its dress and weaponry. In an ostensible show of goodwill, Atahualpa had lured the adventurers deep into the heart of his mountain empire where any potential threat could be isolated and responded to with massive force. Pizarro and his men arrived on Friday November 15, 1532.

The town itself had been largely emptied of its two thousand inhabitants, upon the approach of the Spanish force of 180 men, guided by an Inca noble sent by Atahualpa as an envoy. Atahualpa himself was encamped outside Cajamarca, preparing for his march on Cuzco, where his commanders had just captured Huáscar and defeated his army. According to the chronicles, Atahualpa intended to capture and enslave some Spaniards to share with him their advanced crafts, namely the weaponsmith Juan de Salinas, the horseman Hernán Sánchez Morillo and the barber Francisco López, the last because the emperor's spies had seen him at work and believed he knew how to rejuvenate people. He would execute the rest. For his part, Pizarro was accompanied by a retinue of Cañari chieftains from Tumbes led by Vilchumlay, who might have advised him during his journey. The Cañari stayed on the sidelines to witness the imminent battle.

The book History Of The Conquest Of Peru, written by 19th century author William H. Prescott, recounts the dilemma in which the Spanish force found itself. Any assault on the Inca armies overlooking the valley would have been suicidal. Retreat was equally out of the question, because any show of weakness might have undermined their air of invincibility, and would invite pursuit and closure of the mountain passes. Once the great stone fortresses dotting their route of escape were garrisoned, argued Pizarro, they would prove impregnable. But to do nothing, he added, was no better since prolonged contact with the natives would erode the fears of Spanish "supernatural ways" that kept them at bay.

== Prelude ==
Pizarro gathered his officers on the evening of November 15 and outlined a scheme that recalled memories of Cortés' exploits in Mexico in its audacity: he would capture the emperor from within the midst of his own armies. Since this could not realistically be accomplished in an open field, Pizarro had invited the Inca to Cajamarca.

The next afternoon, Atahualpa led a procession of "a greater part of the Inca's forces", but Pizarro's fortunes changed dramatically when Atahualpa announced that most of his host would set up camp outside the walls of the city. He requested that accommodations be provided only for himself and his retinue, which would forsake its weapons in a sign of amity and absolute confidence.

Shortly before sunset Atahualpa left the armed warriors who had accompanied him on an open meadow about half a mile outside Cajamarca. His immediate party still numbered over seven thousand but were unarmed except for small battle axes intended for show. Atahualpa's attendants were richly dressed in what were apparently ceremonial garments. Many wore gold or silver discs on their heads and the main party was preceded by a group wearing livery of chequered colors, who sang while sweeping the roadway in front of Atahualpa. The Inca himself was carried in a litter lined with parrot feathers and partly covered in silver, carried by eighty Inca courtiers of high rank in vivid blue clothing. Atahualpa's intention appears to have been to impress the small Spanish force with this display of splendor and he had no anticipation of an ambush.

The Spaniards had concealed themselves within the buildings surrounding the empty plaza at the centre of the town. Infantry and horsemen were concealed in the alleyways which opened onto this open square. Spanish infantry were deployed to guard the entrances to a stone building in the centre of the square while men armed with arquebuses and four small cannons took up places within it. Pizarro ordered his men to remain silent and hidden until the guns were fired. During the hours of waiting tension rose amongst the greatly outnumbered Spanish and Pedro Pizarro recalls that many of his fellows urinated "out of pure terror".

Upon entering the square the leading Incans in attendance on Atahualpa divided their ranks to enable his litter to be carried to the centre, where all stopped. An Incan courtier carrying a banner approached the building where the artillery was concealed, while Atahualpa, surprised at seeing no Spanish called out an enquiry.

After a brief pause Friar Vincente de Valverde, accompanied by an interpreter, emerged from the building where Pizarro was lodged. Carrying a cross and a missal the friar passed through the rows of attendants who had spread out to allow the Inca's litter to reach the centre of the square. Valverde approached the Inca, announced himself as the emissary of God and the Spanish throne, and demanded that he accept Catholicism as his faith and Charles V, the Holy Roman Emperor as his sovereign ruler. Atahualpa was insulted and confused by Valverde's words. Although Atahualpa had already determined that he had no intention of conceding to the dictates of the Spanish, according to chronicler Garcilaso de la Vega he did attempt a brusque, bemused inquiry into the details of the Spaniards' faith and their king, which quickly bogged down in poorly-translated semantics and increased the tension of all the participants. Spanish sources differ as to the specific event which initiated combat, but all agree it was a spontaneous decision following the breakdown of negotiations (such as they were) with Atahualpa.

=== Incan account of events ===
Titu Cusi Yupanqui (1529–1571), son of Atahualpa's half-brother Manco II, who had escaped the killings of Atahualpa's general Quizquiz, dictated decades later the only Inca account of the events leading up to the battle. According to Titu Cusi, Atahualpa had received "two Viracochas", Pizarro and de Soto, at a date not specified "many days" before the battle, offering them a golden cup containing ceremonial chicha. "The Spaniard poured it out." The Spaniards then gave Atahualpa a letter (or book) which they said was quillca (writing) of God and of the Spanish king. Offended by the wasting of the chicha, Atahualpa threw the "letter or whatever it was" on the ground, telling them to leave.

On November 16, Atahualpa arrived at Cajamarca with "no weapons for battle or harnesses for defense," although they did carry tomes (knives) and lassos for hunting llamas. The Spanish approached and told Atahualpa that Viracocha had ordered them to tell the Inca who they were. Atahualpa listened, then gave one a gold cup of chicha which was not drunk and given no attention at all. Furious, Atahualpa stood and yelled "If you disrespect me, I will also disrespect you", and said he would kill them, at which the Spanish attacked.

Titu Cusi's only mention of a Bible being presented and then tossed to the ground is restricted to the encounter which took place before the battle, an omission that has been explained as due either to its relative insignificance to the Inca or to confusion between the events of the two days.

== Spanish attack and Atahualpa's capture ==
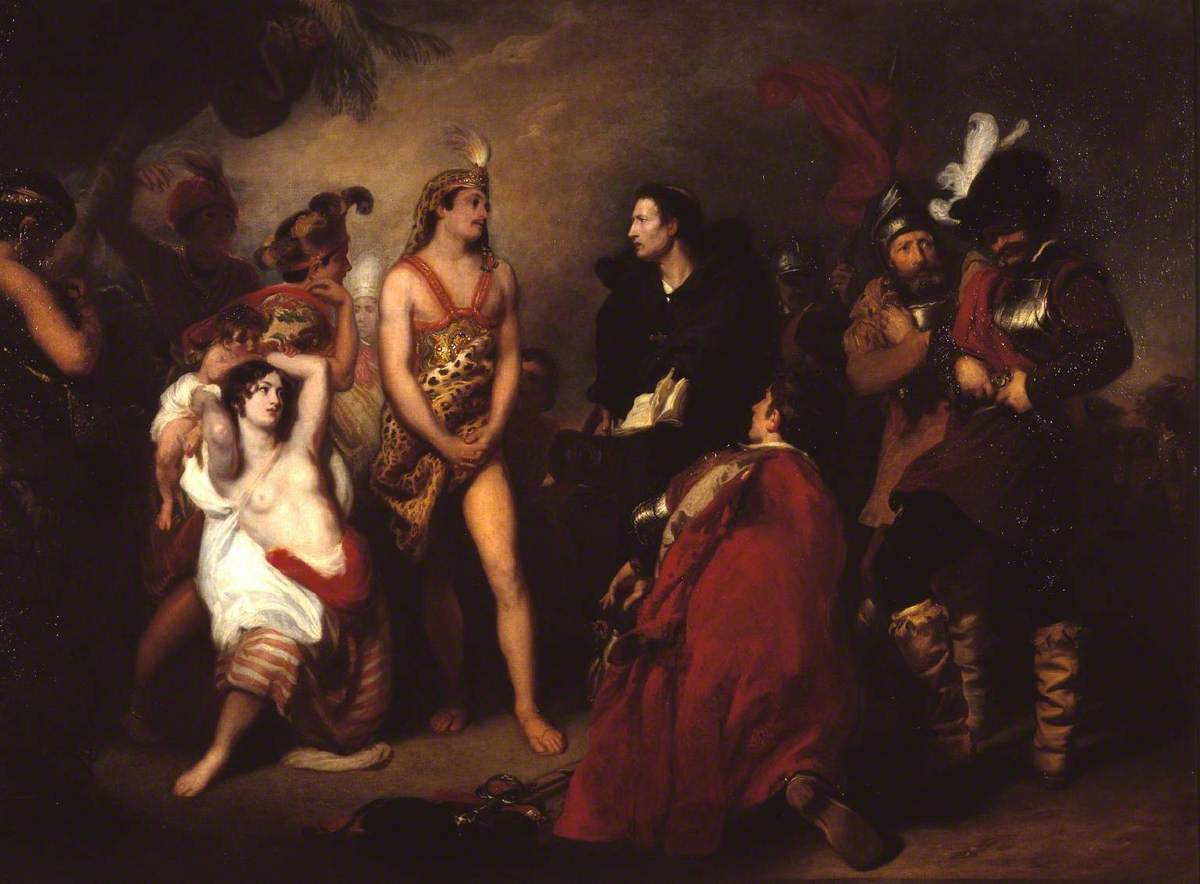
The First Interview Between the Spaniards and the Peruvians by Henry Perronet Briggs, 1827

At the signal to attack, the Spaniards unleashed gunfire at the vulnerable mass of Incans and surged forward in a concerted action. The effect was devastating and the shocked and unarmed Incans offered little resistance. The Spanish forces used a cavalry charge against the Incan forces, in combination with gunfire from cover (the Incan forces also had never encountered firearms before) combined with the ringing bells on the horses to frighten the Inca.

The first target of the Spanish attack was Atahualpa and his top commanders. Pizarro rushed at Atahualpa on horseback, but the Inca remained motionless. The Spanish severed the hands or arms of the attendants carrying Atahualpa's litter to force them to drop it so they could reach him. The Spanish were astounded that the attendants ignored their wounds and used their stumps or remaining hands to hold it up until several were killed and the litter slumped. Atahualpa remained sitting on the litter while a large number of his attendants rushed to place themselves between the litter and the Spanish, deliberately allowing themselves to be killed. While his men were cutting down Atahualpa's attendants, Pizarro rode through them to where a Spanish soldier had pulled the Inca from his litter. While he was doing so, other soldiers also reached the litter and one attempted to kill Atahualpa. Recognizing the value of the Emperor as a hostage, Pizarro blocked the attack and received a sword wound to his hand in consequence.

The main Inca force, which had retained their weapons but remained "about quarter of a league" outside Cajamarca, scattered in confusion as the survivors of those who had accompanied Atahualpa fled from the square, breaking down a fifteen-foot length of wall in the process. Atahualpa's warriors were veterans of his recent northern campaigns and constituted the professional core of the Inca army, seasoned warriors who outnumbered the Spaniards more than 45 to 1 (8,000 to 168). However, the shock of the Spanish attack—coupled with the spiritual significance of losing the Sapa Inca and most of his commanders in one blow—apparently shattered the army's morale, throwing its ranks into terror and initiating a massive rout. There is no evidence that any of the main Inca force attempted to engage the Spaniards in Cajamarca after the success of the initial ambush.

== Aftermath ==
Atahualpa's wife, 10-year-old Cuxirimay Ocllo, was with the army and stayed with him while he was imprisoned. Following his execution she was taken to Cuzco and took the name Doña Angelina. By 1538 Pizarro had taken her as his mistress, and she gave birth to two of Pizarro's sons, Juan and Francisco. Following Pizarro's assassination in 1541, she married the interpreter Juan de Betanzos who later wrote Narratives of the Incas, part one covering Inca history up to the arrival of the Spanish and part two covering the conquest to 1557, mainly from the Inca viewpoint and including mentions of interviews with Inca guards who were near Atahualpa's litter when he was captured. Only the first 18 unpublished chapters of Part One were known until the complete manuscript was found and published in 1987.

Francisco Xerez wrote an account of the Battle of Cajamarca.
