= Pizarro brothers =

Family of Spanish conquistadors

The Pizarro brothers were four Spanish conquistador brothers who came to Peru in 1530. They all were born in Trujillo, Spain. Only one of the brothers, Hernando Pizarro, was a legitimate child of Captain Gonzalo Pizarro y Rodríguez. The four brothers were:

- Juan Pizarro (d. 1536) first illegitimate son of Captain Gonzalo Pizarro y Rodríguez de Aguilar and María Alonso
- Francisco Pizarro (d. 1541) illegitimate son of Captain Gonzalo Pizarro y Rodríguez de Aguilar and Francisca González
- Gonzalo Pizarro (d. 1548) second illegitimate son of Captain Gonzalo Pizarro y Rodríguez de Aguilar and María Alonso
- Hernando Pizarro (d. 1578) legitimate son of Captain Gonzalo Pizarro y Rodríguez de Aguilar and Isabel de Vargas

All of them played a major part in the capture and rule of the Inca Empire. However, after the death of legal governor Francisco, their legitimate claims were practically forfeit. Juan had died during the ten-month-long siege of Cuzco and Hernando was sent back as envoy to Spain and imprisoned in 1540, after accusations of corruption and tax evasion pointed towards the Pizarro administration. After Francisco's assassination in 1541, power was usurped by Cristóbal Vaca de Castro as new governor of "New Castile". In 1544 the king of Spain, who had also granted Francisco governorship in 1528, sent his own envoy Blasco Núñez Vela, as viceroy of Peru. Blasco imprisoned Castro but was the very same year detained and later killed on the behalf of Gonzalo Pizarro, who gathered his supporters and seized much of Peru. When Blasco's successor, Pedro de la Gasca defeated and had Gonzalo executed in 1548, the reign of the Pizarro brothers had definitively passed.

The family group involved in the conquest of the Incas also included a maternal half-brother of Francisco,

- Francisco Martín de Alcántara

and a cousin of the Pizarro brothers,

- Pedro Pizarro

Hernando had two full sisters, Inés Pizarro y de Vargas and Isabel Pizarro y de Vargas, who married Gonzalo de Tapia.
