= Vince Lee =

Vince Lee may refer to:

- Vince Lee (explorer), (born 1938). American explorer
- Vince Weiguang Li (born 1968), Chinese Canadian man responsible for the killing of Tim McLean
