= Gonzalo Pizarro y Rodríguez =

Gonzalo Pizarro y Rodríguez de Aguilar (1446–1522) was a Spanish Captain from the region of Extremadura who participated in several campaigns in Italy and Navarre. He is most famed for fathering the four Pizarro brothers, Francisco (born 1471 to 1478), Hernando (born 1478 to 1508), Gonzalo (born 1502) and Juan (born 1511), who conquered the Inca Empire. Hernando was the only legitimate son of Captain de Aguilar among his four sons.

His first cousin was the grandmother of the also-famed conquistador Hernán Cortés, the conqueror of the Aztec Empire.
