= Vince Lee (explorer) =

American mountaineer (1938–2024)

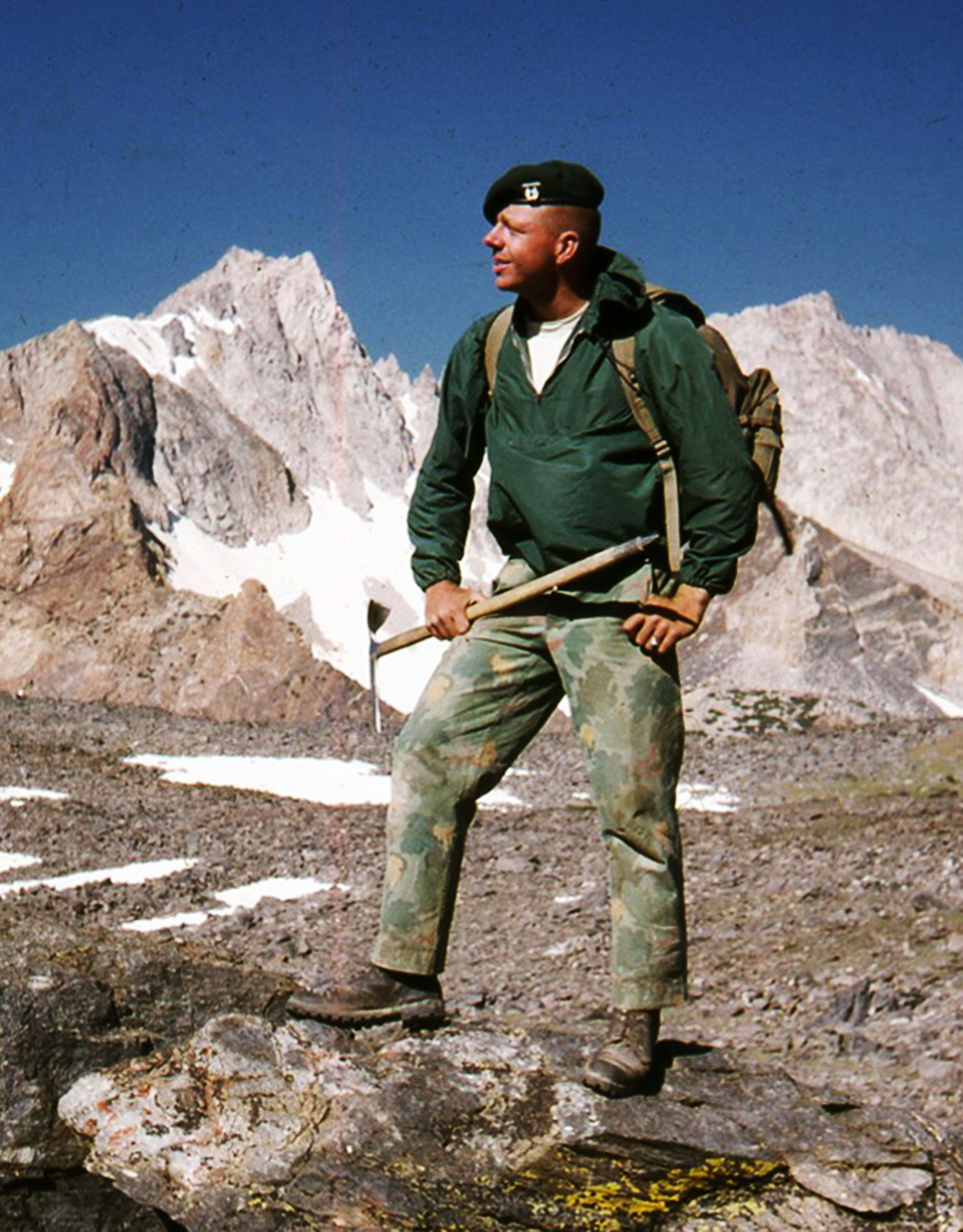
- Lee in 1963
- Born: November 7, 1938; Gainesville, Florida, U.S.
- Died: April 17, 2024 (aged 85); Cortez, Colorado, U.S.
- Education: Princeton University, B.A, 1960; MFA 1966
- Known for: Mountaineering; Inca explorations; megalith manipulator
- Spouse(s): Danielle F. Hayn (1961–78), Nancy Lee (née Goodman) (m. 1983)
- Children: 3
- Website: www.vince-lee.com

Vincent "Vince" Richards Lee (November 7, 1938 – April 17, 2024) was an American writer who served as a Marine Corps officer, founder and chief instructor of his own mountaineering school, western residential architect, Andean explorer, scholar of megalithic monuments, avocational Southwest archaeologist, and author of several books on those subjects.

== Early life and education ==
Although born in Gainesville, Florida, Lee and his older brother Claude Jr. were raised in New York. His father, Claude Francis Lee, was an owner and manager of several Paramount movie theaters in 1930s Florida, and then manager of Paramount's newly formed East Coast public relations division in New York City. The Lees were long time friends of Claude Pepper, Florida Senator and Congressman of the Roosevelt and Truman years. Recognizing Claude Lee's influence, Pepper named him to his "band of brothers" who advised him at critical times in his career.

Lee attended North Tarrytown High School, then selected Princeton University and entered its Regular Naval ROTC program during 1956–60, incurring a three-year obligation for military service. He elected duty with the U. S Marine Corps and went through the Officer Candidates School at Marine Corps Base Quantico in his junior year. Enrolled in the School of Architecture, he graduated in 1960 with a BA in Architecture and was commissioned as a US Marine Corps 2nd Lieutenant. After Marine Officer Basic School, again at Quantico, he was assigned as an Infantry Officer in the 2nd Marine Division, Camp Pendleton, California. He married Danielle Hayn just before his transfer to Fleet duty (Mar, 1961). They had identical twin sons and some years later, a third son. They eventually divorced in 1977.

== US Marine Corps service ==
Lee served with the 3rd Marine Division on Okinawa, and on deployments in the Western Pacific, Philippines, South Korea and Japan. With a year remaining in his 3-year obligation, he transferred to the Marine Corps Mountain Warfare Training Center (MWTC) in California's Sierra Nevadas After completing the courses, he became an Instructor/Guide in the Mountain Leadership School.

While assigned to the MWTC, Lee applied his knowledge of civilian professional mountaineering techniques to improve the school's techniques, as recounted in the Marine Corps history of the MWTC that provided a brief summary of his contributions to its mission, stating, "Over time he (Lee) skillfully modernized the syllabus of the Mountain Leadership Course by introducing the latest climbing techniques and lightweight equipment that he believed would have equal application in military mountaineering". In the same publication, the chief instructor at the center, Orlo K. Steele, a subsequent Marine 2-star General, placed him in its "list of superb mountain leaders". Lee applied for entrance to Princeton's Graduate School of Architecture, and in the Fall 1964 began his graduate studies when released from active duty.

== Mountaineer ==
In the interval between his Marine Corp discharge and the start of graduate school at Princeton, Lee began an association with the Outward Bound program. Starting as a mountaineering instructor at the Colorado School in Marble, where he became friends with Teton guide, Paul Petzoldt, and continuing during the summer between his graduate school years. Following graduation, while still involved with the startup North Carolina Outward Bound School (NCOBS), Lee became friends with its founding director, Jim (Pop) Hollandsworth, an outdoor educator at the Asheville School.

In 1968, Lee and Hollandsworth conducted the first of three seasons of Asheville School mountaineering expeditions. While maintaining his architectural practice in Jackson Hole, he developed the Asheville School program into what became 'High Country West (HCW), Wilderness Expeditions', with several three-week sessions each summer for the next 23 years. He taught climbing skills to hundreds of beginning climbers, leading parties to nearly 500 peaks in the Rockies, Canada and overseas. As advertised in the local newspaper, HCW's expeditions offered 30-day trips varying in degree of difficulty from "mellow outing" to "strenuous".

== Architect ==
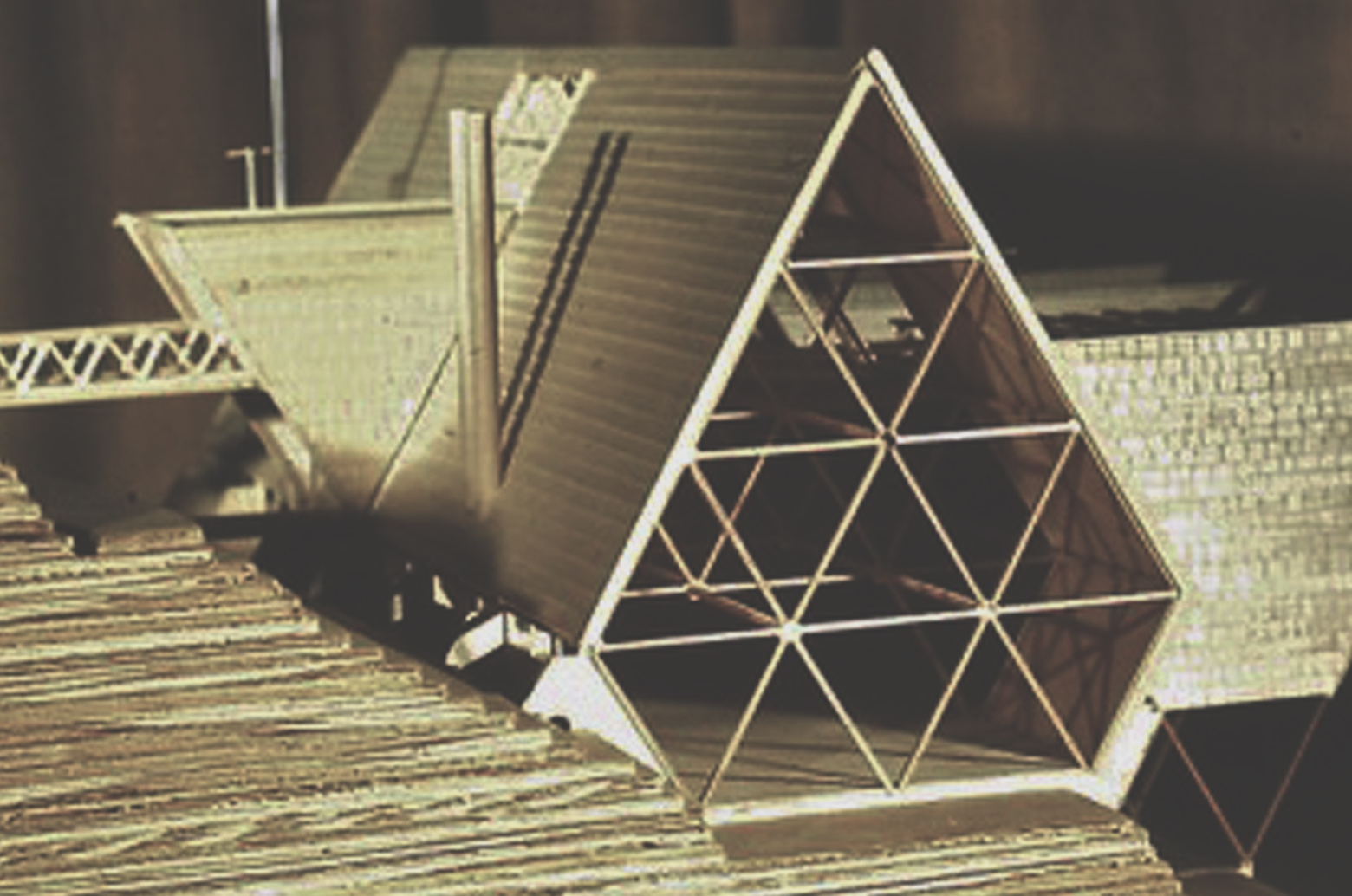
Lee's graduate model of NCOBS Asheville project,1964

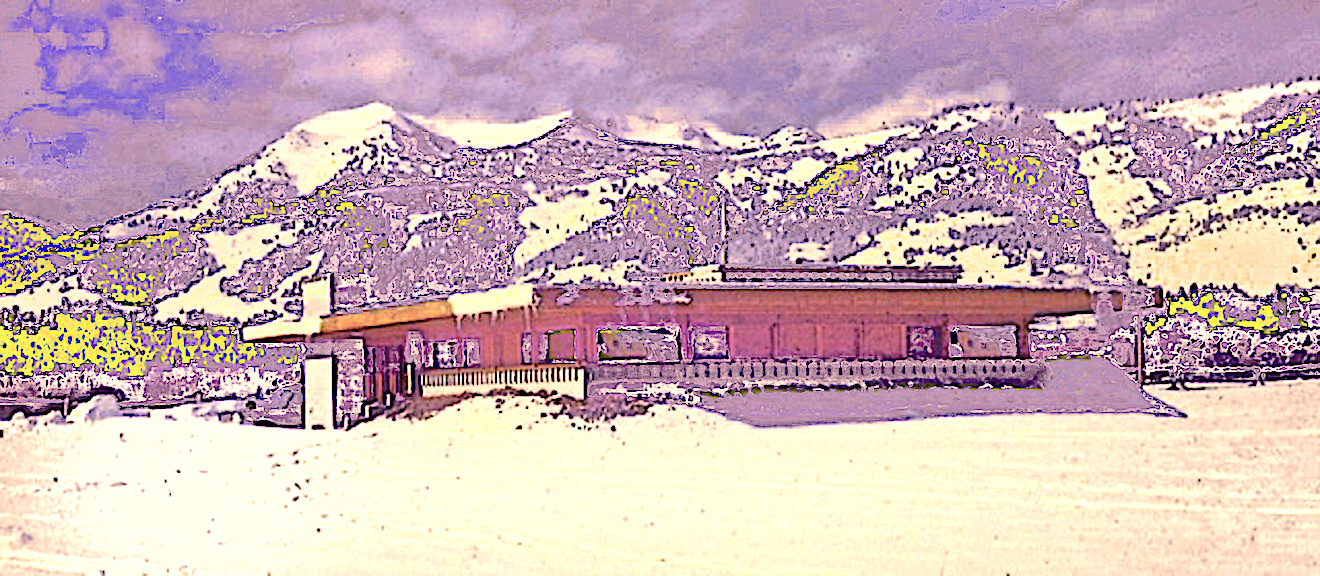
Lee's first house, Jackson WY, 1968

Lee received his MFA in architecture magna cum laude from Princeton in 1966. His faculty thesis advisors were Michael Graves and Peter Eisenmann. For his master's thesis, he created a design for the newly formed, all-year North Carolina Outward Bound School (NCOBS) in Asheville, North Carolina. His design got very favorable "local boy makes good" news in local newspapers and the Tarrytown Daily News.

The NCOBS Board hired him in fall 1966 for its construction drawings. Accepting his first architectural commission, the Lee family moved to Asheville, where Lee joined a local firm and began the detailed plans. However, the NCOBS program was downsized and the new building project fell through. In spring 1967, Dani and the children temporarily returned home to New York while Lee headed west to the Tetons in search of a job and home for his family. Stopping at Lander, he worked a season as an instructor/guide with the new National Outdoor Leadership School (NOLS) led by Paul Petzoldt.

In fall 1967, reunited with his family, he settled into a small log cabin in Jackson Hole. He found employment with a local architect designing the new Jackson Hole Mountain Resort. After nearly a year with this first employer, he was fired in a disagreement over time off to climb with Pop Hollandsworth's Asheville School. He soon found a position with a long-time local designer. Lee and his new boss, John Morgan, formed their own architectural design firm Design Associates, Architects (D/A), in Wilson, a small village near Jackson. When Morgan retired, Lee became sole owner. In 1968, he bought a 1 1/4-acre field on which he built his first house.

Lee had become an active environmentalist at the time of the first Earth Day, 1970. His activities caught the attention of Wyoming's Republican governor, Stan Hathaway, who appointed him to the state's then new Air Quality Advisory Board. He was re-appointed to three terms on the seven-seat Wyoming Environmental Quality Council by governors from both political parties. He also became the local representative of The Nature Conservancy, served on the Jackson Hole Scenic Area Study Group, and filed briefly for County Commissioner of Teton County. He was a founding board member and 6-year chairman of the Jackson Hole Land Trust (1980–1997), When he later moved to Cortez, Colorado, he continued his activism as a member and two-term chairman (2009–2013) of the Montezuma Land Conservancy, a conservation program for the Four Corners region.

Nearing retirement in 1998, Lee passed along the firm to his third son Christopher.

== Andean explorers ==
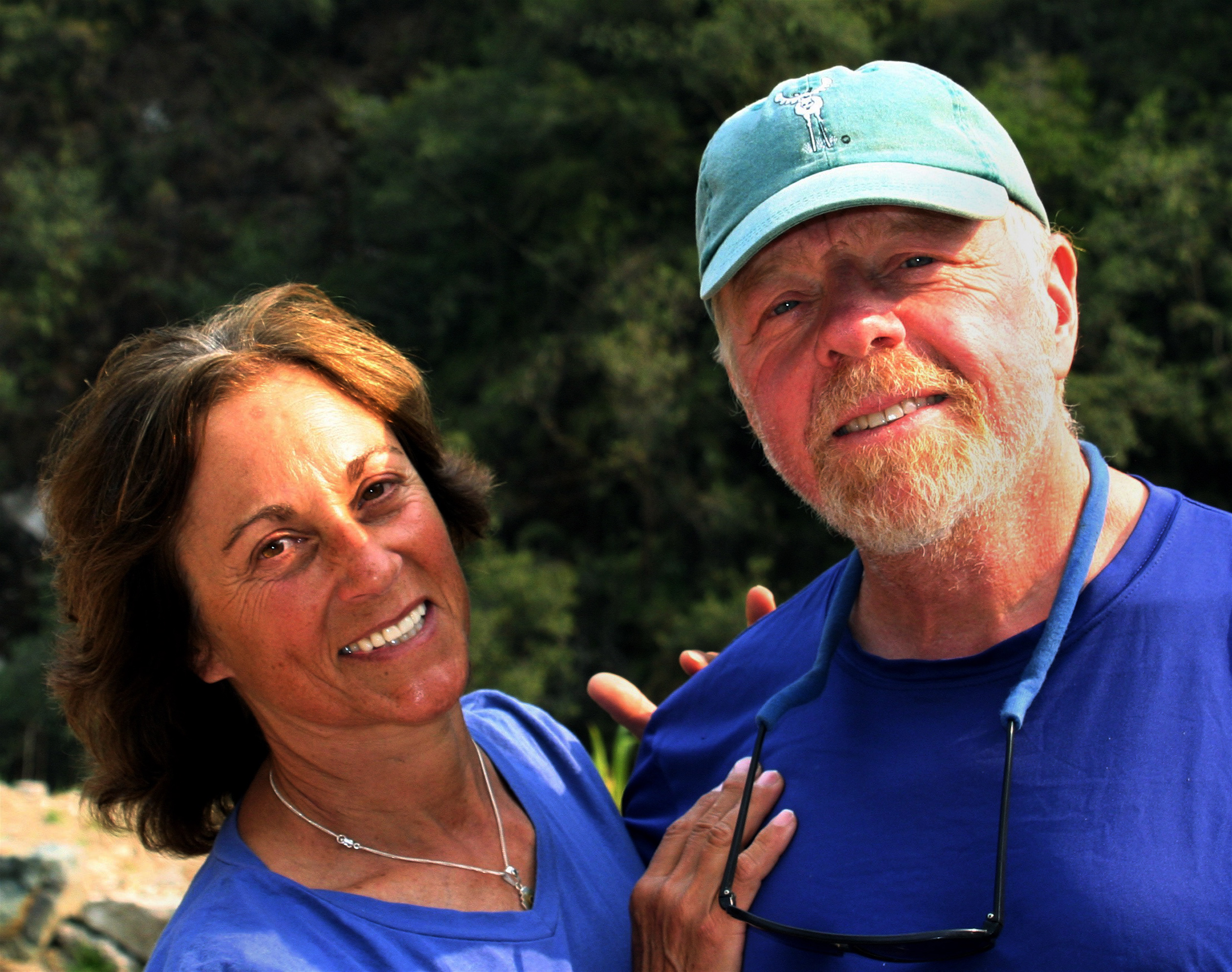
Fellow explorers, Nancy and Vince Lee

Six years after his 1977 divorce, Lee married a fellow Jackson Hole resident, Nancy Goodman. An early Peace Corps volunteer in the high Andes of Peru and also an Outward Bound instructor in both Minnesota and British Columbia.

On his 1979 HCW expedition into Colombia's Sierra Nevada de Santa Marta, Lee fell 'under the spell of the Andes' as he wrote in Old School, (Ch 13). A month among the indigenous Kogi Indians sparked his long-dormant interest in pre-Columbian societies and his architect's fascination with buildings and construction led inevitably to yet another "career", this time in Andean archaeology.

Lee's road to his Vilcabamba discoveries began with a chance reading of the book 'Antisuyo' by the explorer Gene Savoy about his Peruvian discoveries. Intrigued by Savoy's accounts, Lee and two Wyoming climbing friends set out in 1982 to find and climb a legendary peak mentioned by Savoy. The strange crag overlooked the extensive but unmapped ruins at nearby Espíritu Pampa (the Plain of Ghosts), visited years earlier by both Savoy and Hiram Bingham, the 'discoverer' of Machu Picchu. Lee and his companions spent three weeks on that first expedition, one he named SixPac Manco I for reasons explained in his 1985 book, Sixpac Manco. Aided by Savoy's directions they found their way to the gigantic granite peak and made the first known ascent to its summit. Named Icma Colla (the Widowed Queen) or as Savoy spells it Iccma Ccolla, it was a sacred Inca landmark according to the local Indians.

Bingham's pronouncements to the contrary, Savoy thought Espíritu Pampa the long-lost final capital of the Inca Empire. At that time, Vilcabamba was still little-known unmapped country. Subsequent extensive explorations and researches by Vince Lee in the final decades of the 20th century firmly established Vilcabamba as the last Inca capital of its Sapa Inca – Tupac Amaru and to whose memory Lee dedicated his book as "a promise kept". Lee's researches, described in his book on Vilcabamba, later were applied by Gary Urton and Brian Bauer in their own Incan researches and explorations.

=== Methodology ===
The Lees traveled lightly carrying only backpacks, and thus were able to explore extensive areas of the Peruvian Andes inaccessible to pack animals and heavily laden exploration groups. His 'lean-burn' approach, as Hugh Thomson calls it, both impressed and appalled his fellow Andean explorers. Back home he turned his sketches into the detailed architectural drawings published in his book. Lee's expeditions located, explored and mapped every known archaeological site in Vilcabamba and others they discovered themselves. John Hemming, a former director and secretary of the Royal Geographical Society, author of The Conquest of the Incas, who also wrote the foreword to Lee's book, pronounced that Lee's expeditions left "... no doubt whatsoever that Espíritu Pampa was the location of the final Inca capital...".

Lee's work has been recognized by Dr. John Howland Rowe, professor of archaeology at U. C. Berkeley. Following a chance meeting in 1984, Rowe found sufficient merit in Lee's Vilcabamba work that he nominated him for membership in the Institute of Andean Studies, and became Lee's informal mentor until his death in 2004. During his tenure with the institute, Lee has given papers at 24 annual meetings and published peer-reviewed papers in Ñawpa Pacha, the institute's journal. Lee's published work has been referred to by active Andean scholars of the recent decades. Kim MacQuarrie, author of The Last Days of the Incas, devotes much of his final chapter and epilog to Vince and Nancy Lee's place in the story of Vilcabamba. More recently, Lee wrote Chapter 7.3: "Vilcabamba: Last Stronghold of the Inca" in the newly released Oxford University Press, Handbook of the Incas.

== Southwest archaeologist ==
The Lees retired in 1998 to the Four Corners country of southwest Colorado. Surrounded by centuries-old Ancient Pueblo archaeological sites of the Colorado Plateau, Lee became intrigued by nearby Chaco Canyon's 'Great Houses', and compiled a treatise on the subject: A New Box for Chaco. Drawing on his knowledge of both societies, he makes an intriguing case for possible equivalents between the 'Chaco Phenomenon' and the Inca Empire.

Lee investigated techniques of design and construction that enabled ancient societies to quarry, move and erect enormous stone structures. His findings, analyses, and reconstructions are documented in his book Ancient Moonshots, where he discusses those techniques and his self-published collection of monographs on the subject, Building Big.

Several of his projects have been aired on the History and Discovery Channels; two were featured in NOVA television episodes. The first dealt with how the Incas managed to closely fit the huge boulders in the massive terrace walls of Sacsahuaman, the Inca "fortress" above Cuzco, Peru. Lee's proposed method first appeared in Ñawpa Pacha and has been updated in his book, Ancient Moonshots. His other NOVA project, on the Rapanui of Easter Island, demonstrated how the islanders plausibly could have erected their giant moai. He describes his solution to the problem of erecting El Gigante, the largest moai ever carved in the Rapa Nui Journal, and in his own publication on El Gigante.

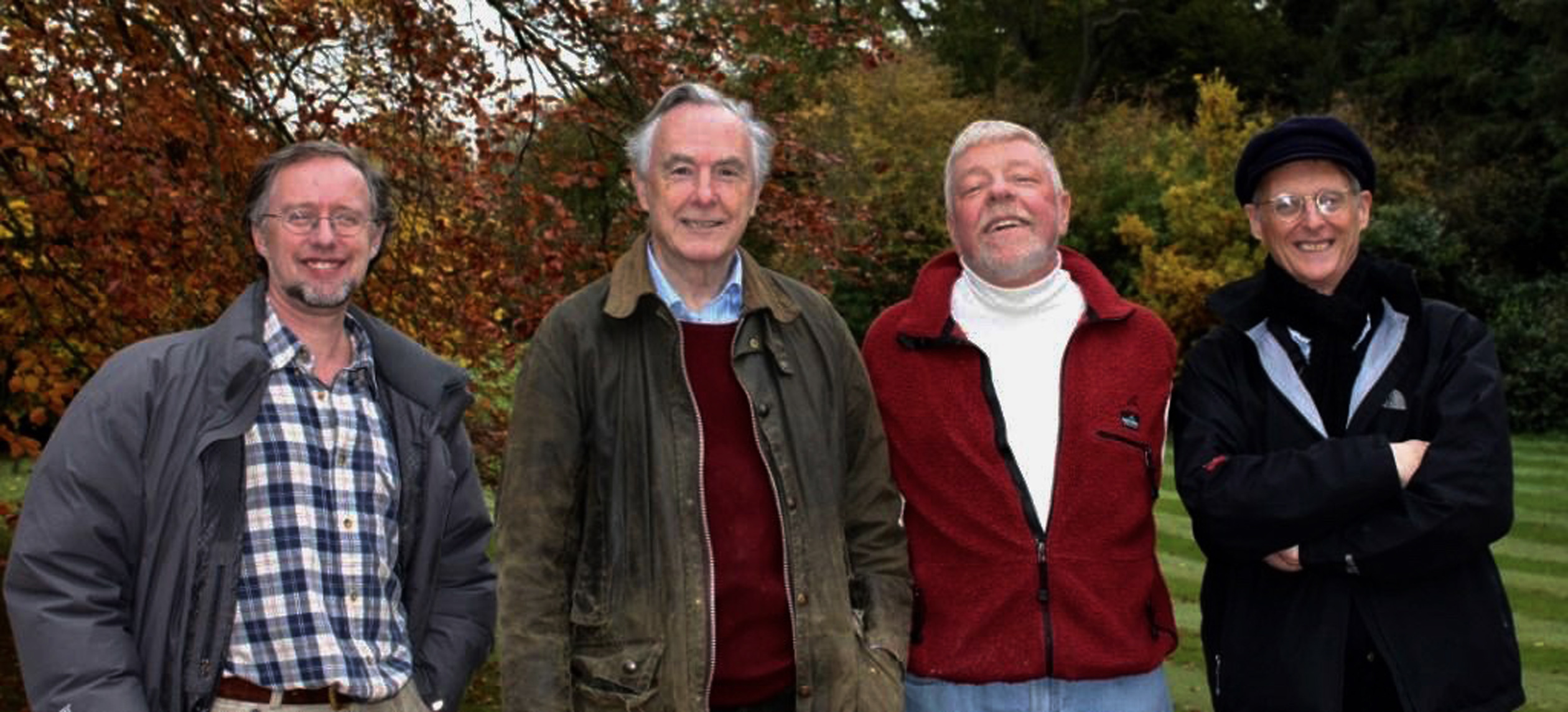

Fellow Andeans; L to R: Hugh Thompson, John Hemming, Vince Lee, John Beauclerk in 2010. Lee died on April 17, 2024, at the age of 85.

== Affiliations and awards ==
In addition to his 1985 induction into the Institute of Andean Studies, Lee has been a member since 1970 of the American Alpine Club; a Fellow since 1990 of the New York Explorers Club; former research associate at the San Diego Museum of Man and since 2000, a member and lecturer at the Stone Foundation in Santa Fe. As a member, he made presentations at the foundation's symposia in 2000, 2003, 2005 and 2013.

== Publications ==
- Lee, Vincent R. (2000). Forgotten Vilcabamba, Final Stronghold of the Incas. Sixpac Manco. ISBN 0-9677109-0-1.
- Lee, Vincent R. (2013). Ancient Moonshots. Sixpac Manco. ISBN 978-0-578-13428-4.
- Lee, Vincent R. (2017). Archaeology in the Rough. Sixpac Manco. ISBN 978-1-5323-6656-7.
- Lee, Vincent R. (2016). Building Big With Next To Nothing. Sixpac Manco. ISBN 978-1-5323-6657-4.
- Lee, Vincent R. (2018). Old School, A Mountain Guide's Life Before The Net. Sixpac Manco. ISBN 978-1-5323-6655-0.
- Lee, Vincent R. (2022). A Perspective on Context. Sixpac Manco. ISBN 979-8-88680-557-4.
- Lee, Vincent R. (2024). An Anthology of Archaeological Odd Jobs. Sixpac Manco. ISBN 979-888955-480-6.
