= Muyuq Marka =

Archaeological site in Peru

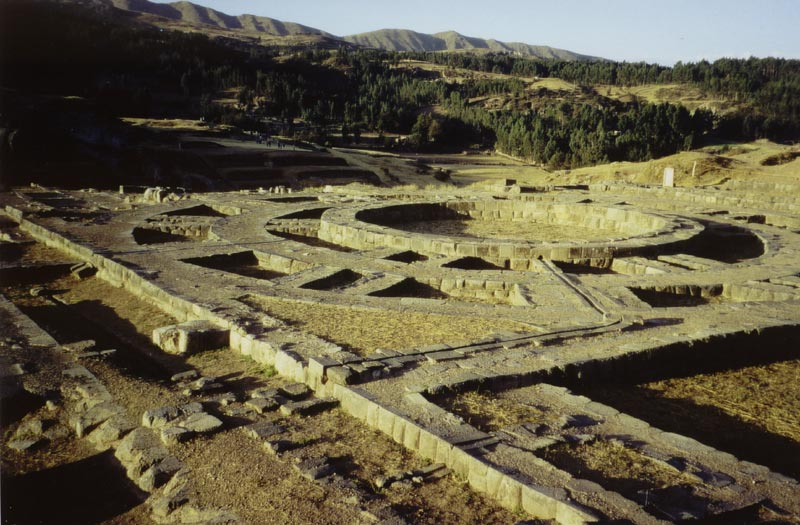
- The base of the circular tower of Muyuq Marka still remains

- Location within Peru
- 13°30′32.5″S 71°58′58.3″W
- Type: Sanctuary
- Location: Cusco, Cusco Region, Peru
- Region: Andes
- Part of: Saksaywaman

Muyuq Marka, also Muyuqmarka (Quechua, hispanicized spellings Moyoc Marca, Muyucmarca, Muyuqmarca, Muyucmarka, Muyuc Marca, Muyuc Marka), is an archaeological site in Peru. It is the base of what was a round Incan tower, which is situated within the fortress Saksaywaman above Cuzco. It was used as a Temple of Inti (god Sun), but became part of a complex of rectangular buildings which mostly still remain today. However, the temple and the two flanking towers were dismantled during the Spanish rule. What remains of Muyuq Marka indicates that it was "a round building with an open central court which had a fountain." The temple had triple walls, which were aligned with the zenith sunrise and the antizenith sunset.

It was one of the three towers that were in the upper part of the Inca temple of Sacsayhuamán. This tower is famous because in 1536, in the Battle of Sacsayhuaman the Inca army soldier named Cahuide jumped from the top of the tower so as not to fall into the hands of the Spaniards. According to "Inca" Garcilaso de la Vega this tower was a store of pure water.

The Muyuqmarka consists of three concentric, circular stone walls connected by a series of radial walls. There are three channels constructed to bring water into what many scientists consider to be a reservoir. A web-like pattern of 34 lines intersects at the center and there is also a pattern of concentric circles that corresponded to the location of the circular walls.

Originally, the Myuqmarka was a building with 4 superposed floors. The first body would have had a square floor; the second would have been cylindrical; the third would have had also a cylindrical shape. The successive would have formed circular cultivation terraces with decreasing width, being the widest of 3.6 m and the narrowest of 3 m. The tower would have ended up in a conic ceiling. Muyu Marca must have reached a total height of 20 meters. It was an amazing work that generated the admiration of several chroniclers. The Spaniards destroyed it, in spite of the protests both from Cieza and Inca Garcilaso. (3)

== Description by the chronicles ==
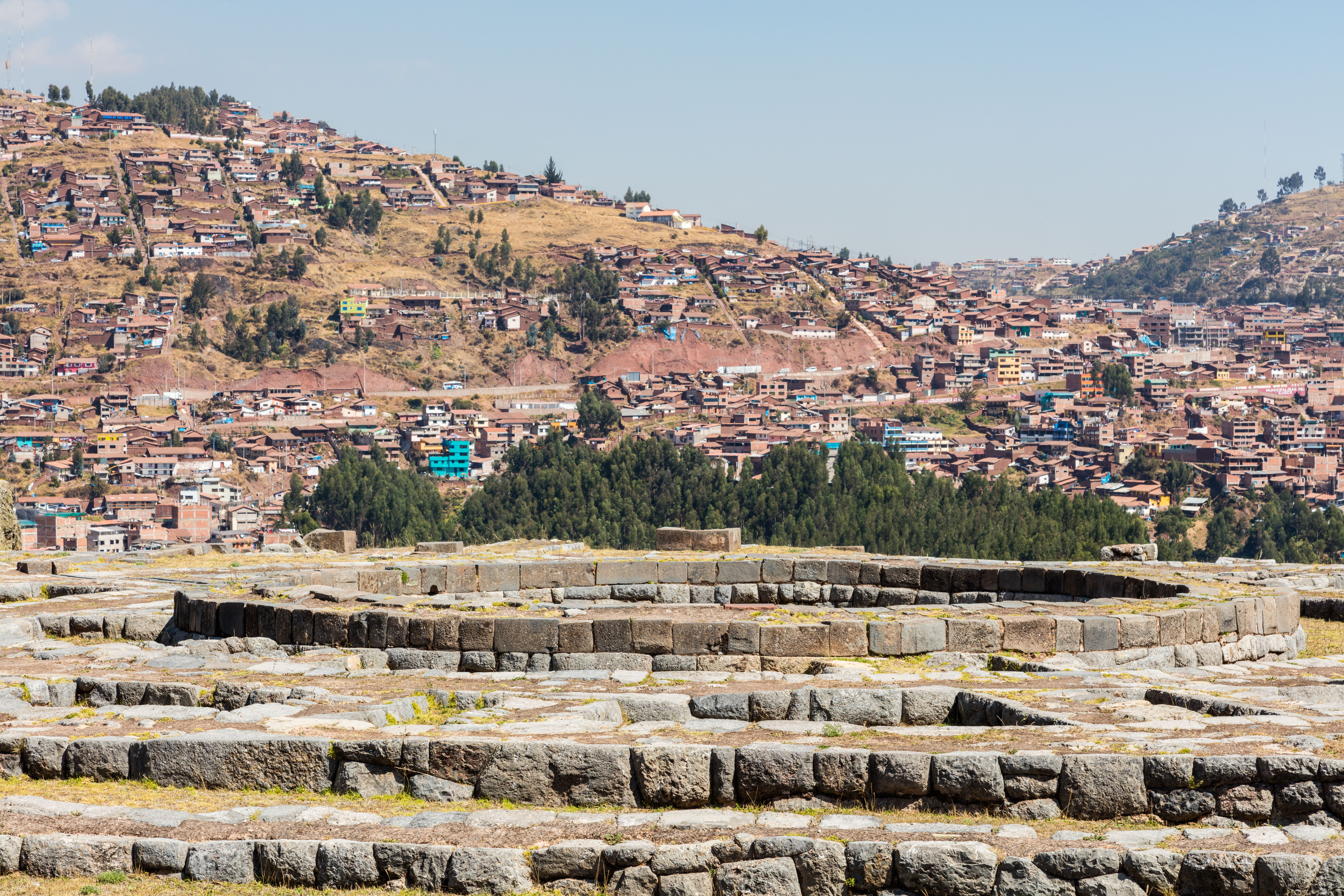
View of Muyuq Marka with the city of Cusco in the background.

Several chroniclers name three towers that were on top of the hill of Sacsayhuamán. One of them is Pedro Sánchez de la Hoz who entered Cusco along with Francisco Pizarro. In his chronicle he tells us that in Sacsayhuamán there were three towers, the one in the middle in a cubic form of four or five bodies superimposed one on top of the other. However, Garcilaso de la Vega contradicts him by stating that the middle tower was circular in shape. But both agree that there were three towers and that their sizes were considerable. "Inca" Garcilaso narrates that under the towers there were huge tunnels that interconnected with each other even between the three towers, he also says that in his childhood he used to play there but only until the beginning of its destruction by the Spaniards. Subsequently, Pedro Pizarro referred to two towers "formed by two very tall cubes", probably he only managed to observe Paucamarca and Sallacmarca because Muyuq Marka had already been destroyed by the Spaniards.

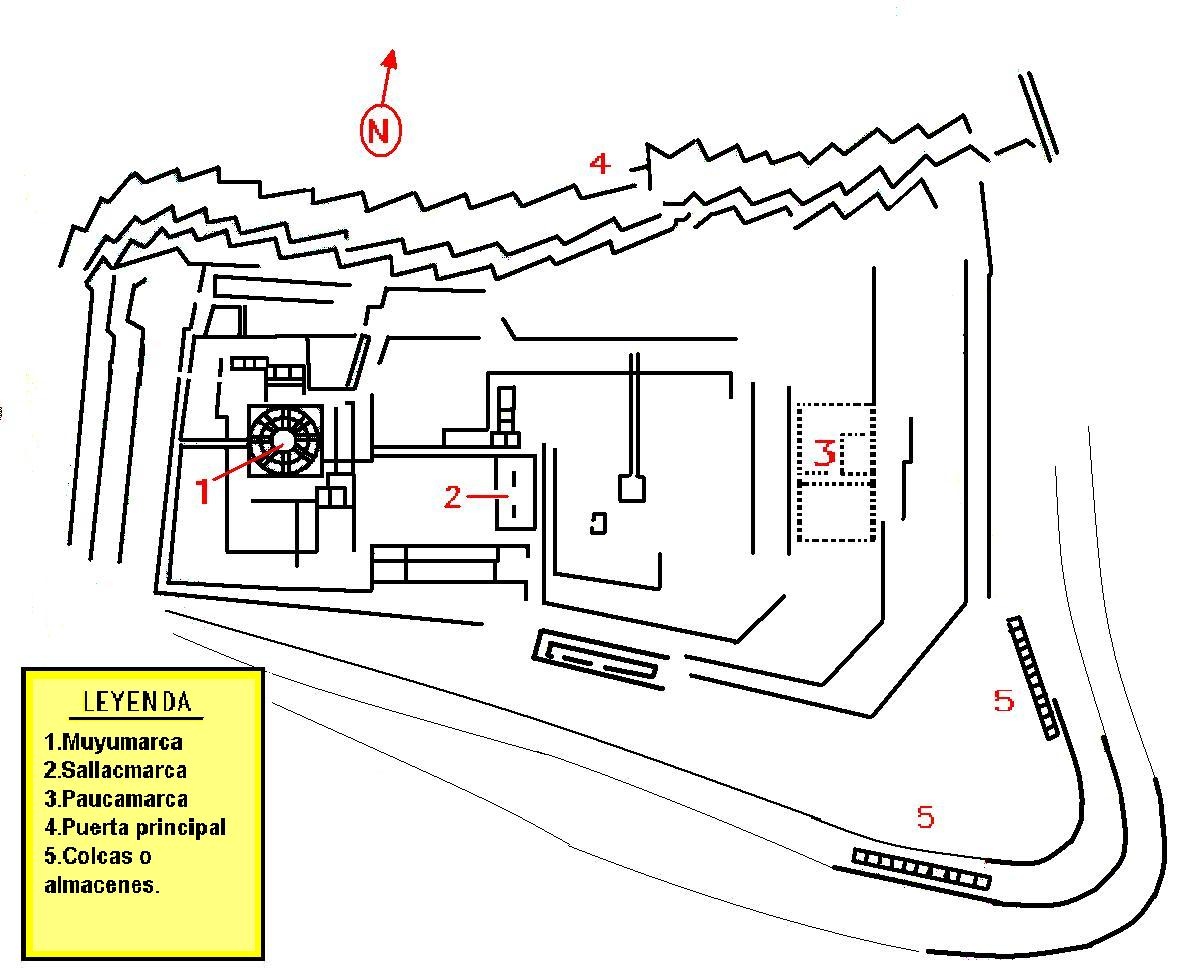
Map of Sacsayhuamán.

== See also ==
- Plaza de Armas (Cusco)
