= Cahuide =

Pre-Hispanic hero during the conquest of Peru

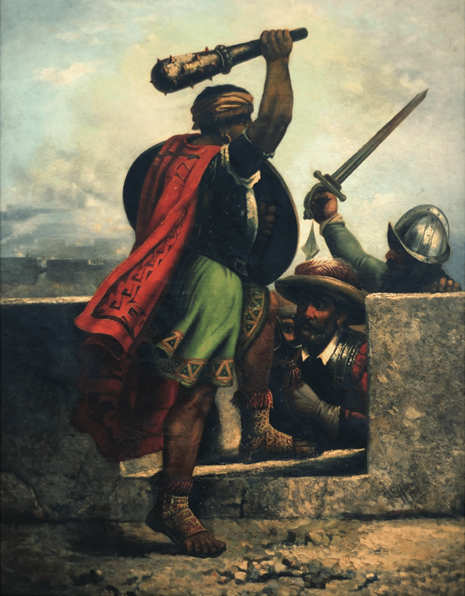
- The Inca captain Cahuide defending the tower of Muyucmarca from the Spanish hands.
- Born: 16th century
- Died: May 1536; Sacsayhuamán, Cusco

Cahuide was an Inca nobleman and warrior of the 16th century (1536) in Cuzco, Peru, who participated in the battle of Sacsayhuamán, led by Manco Inca.

In one of his battles when the castle he was defending fell into the hands of Conquistador, he jumped from the top of one of the three towers of Sacsayhuamán, called Muyuq Marka, so as not to surrender to his enemies.

== Name ==
Some historians have recorded the names Quispe Tito, Titu Cusi Huallpa, or Culla, and others Surihuamán. His precise name is not yet known but he is mostly known as "Cahuide" which derives from the Quechua word: Kawiri meaning watchman.

== Inca commander ==
Cahuide served as a commander in the times of the Inca civil war and the conquest; he was an "orejón chief" (trait of Inca royalty). He was an example of stubborn courage in the ranks of the Inca army.

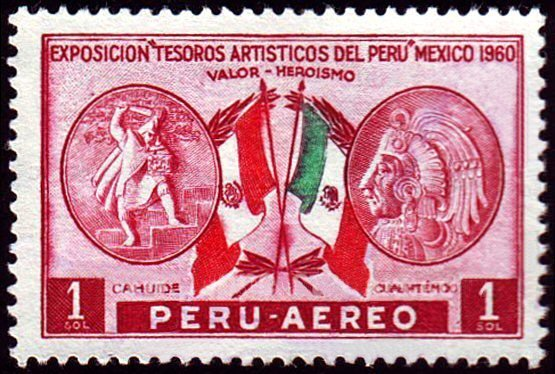
Cahuide on a postage stamp from 1962, next to Cuauhtémoc.

In 1536 the Spanish Conquistador took over Cusco. Cauhide joined the rebellion already started by Manco and swore to fight to the death for the recapture of Tahuantinsuyo. Later he was part of an army who surrounded Cuzco, for several months, and fought in the streets of the imperial city against the army of Pizarro brothers.

Looking to find a way to end the battle, the Spanish left Cuzco. Instead they used long ladders to climb up the walls of Sacsayhuamán and to attack the fortress. Sacsayhuamán fortress was the strategic place from which Manco Inca's troops directed their attacks on the city. After a tough fight, the Spaniards and their indigenous allies opened their way through the walls of the fortress. When Willaq Umu (high priest), realized that the capture of the fortress was imminent, he missioned Cahuide to command the fortress and himself secretly left through some hidden passages along the river to save the conduct of the war.

The fighting in Sacsayhuamán continued for several days, with courage on both sides. However, the Inca warriors in the fortress ran out of supplies of stones and arrows, and it was rumored among the Spanish that they also lacked water. So they launched more attacks with their ladders on the Inca bastions.

== Tributes ==
This Inca character from the history of Peru (time of the Spanish conquest) has received some tributes throughout the Republican era:

- In 1932, neo-Peruvian style coins were minted with the image of the Inca general Cahuide.
- The Peruvian sculptor Artemio Ocaña has made a piece to Cahuide that is located in the city of Huancayo.
- In the 21st century in the town of Maca, department of Arequipa (near Chivay), a monumental complex was built in homage to the Inca Cahuide. This monumental complex is about 4.60 meters high and represents Cahuide fighting on an Inca tower and killing a Spaniard.

== See also ==
- Manco Inca Yupanqui
- Chalcuchímac
- Quizquiz
