= Siege of Cusco =

1536–37 attempt by the Incan Empire to retake Cuzco from Spanish conquistadores

- Part of the Spanish conquest of Peru
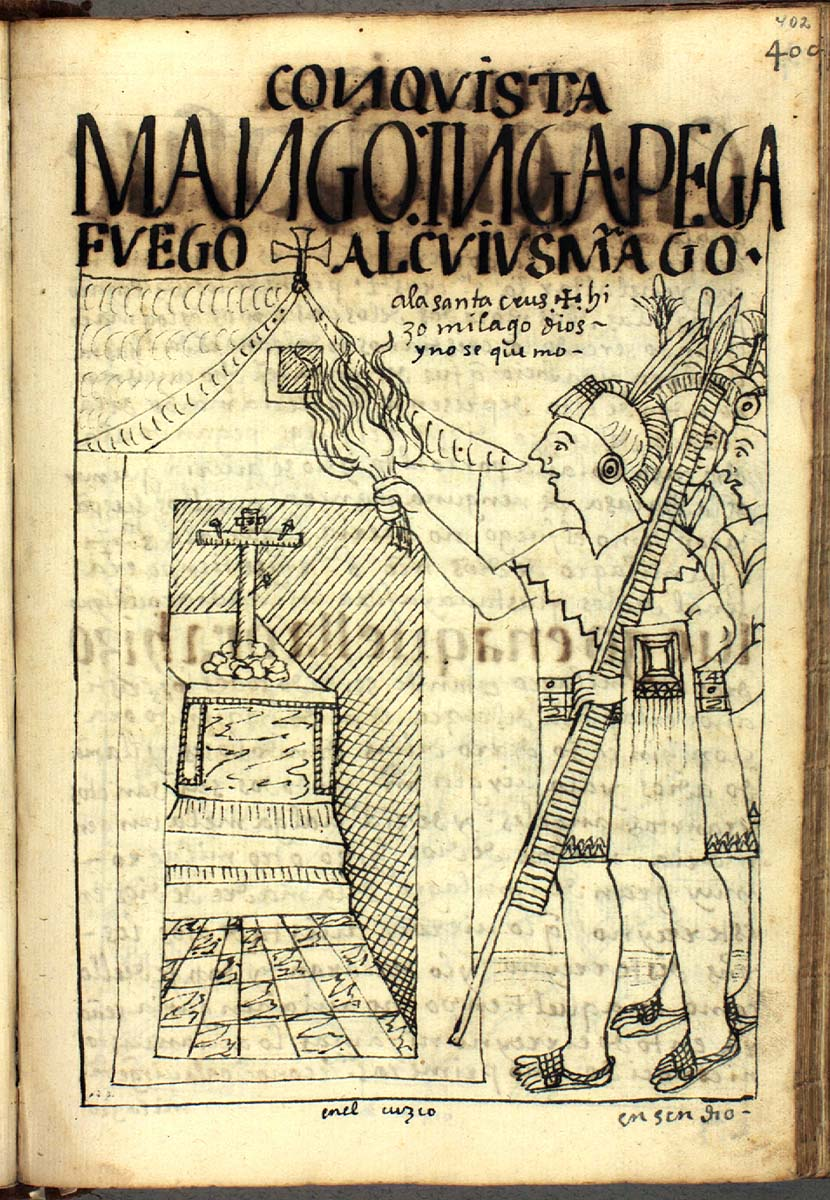
- The siege of Cusco according to Felipe Guaman Poma de Ayala
Date	May 6, 1536 – early March 1537
Location	Cuzco, Peru 13°31′01″S 71°58′43″W
Result	Spanish victory

Belligerents
Nueva Castilla; Native allies: Huancas; Cañari; Chachapoyas; Chankas	Nueva Toledo	Remnants of the Inca Empire

Commanders and leaders
Hernando Pizarro (POW); Gonzalo Pizarro (POW); Juan Pizarro II †; Chilche	Diego de Almagro; Rodrigo Orgóñez	Manco Inca Yupanqui; Cahuide †

Strength
30,000 Indios auxiliares 190 Spaniards	700 Spaniards (as for early 1537), 50,000 Indios auxiliares	40,000 to 100,000 Inca warriors

Casualties and losses
Unknown	Unknown, but low	Unknown

The 10-month siege of Cusco by the Incan army under the command of Sapa Inca Manco Inca Yupanqui started on 6 May 1536 and ended in March 1537. The city was held by a garrison of Spanish conquistadors and Indian auxiliaries led by Hernando Pizarro. The Incans hoped to restore their empire (1438–1533) with this action, but it was ultimately unsuccessful.

== Background ==
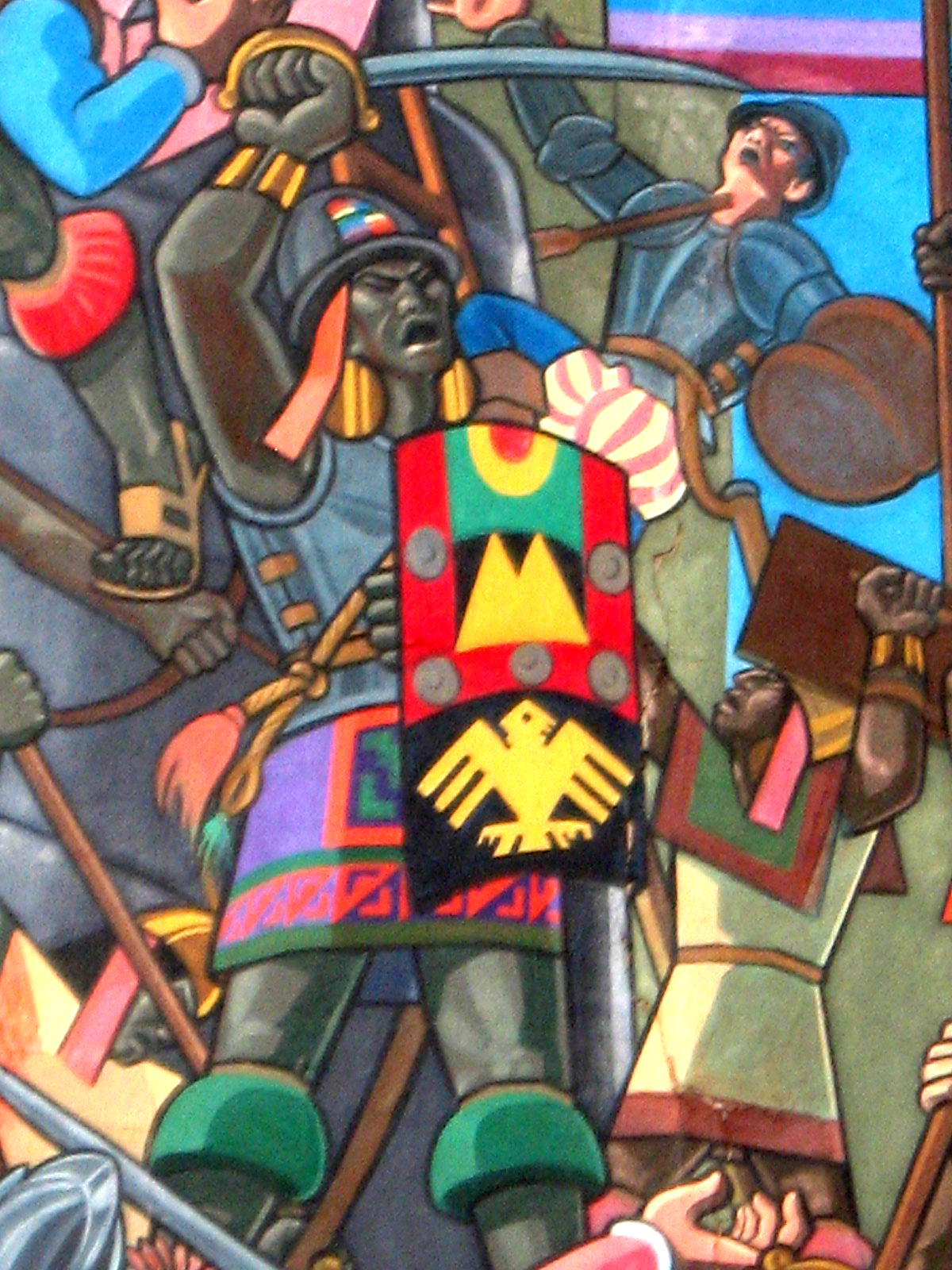
Manco Inca leading the rebellion, detail of a painting by Juan Bravo in the municipality of Cusco

Francisco Pizarro, Hernando's older brother, received chief rights of discovery and conquest in Peru, or New Castile, and the Governorship of the territory from King Charles I of Spain in the Capitulation of July 1529. Pizarro and his Spanish conquistadors invaded Peru and captured Atahualpa, the Sapa Inca, on November 16, 1532, at Cajamarca. The events at Cajamarca initiated the Spanish conquest of the Incas. The Spaniards later killed Atahualpa in July 1533, after deceptively acquiring a ransom of over 39,000 lb (18 t) of gold and silver for his release. Atahualpa's death exacerbated pre-existing dynastic rivalries for the Inca throne and plunged the Incas into a state of disorder and disunity. Francisco Pizarro installed Tupac Hualpa, one of Atahualpa's brothers and rivals, in September 1533, as Sapa Inca in an attempt to legally recognize indigenous lineage and subordinate the Incas under Spanish authority. Chalcuchima, a leader of Atahualpa's remnant loyalist troops, killed Tupac Hualpa at Jauja. Francisco Pizarro replaced Tupac Hualpa with Manco Inca, another one of Atahualpa's brothers, and son of the last truly unified Inca ruler, Huayna Capac. Pizarro first met Manco Inca on the initial Spanish march to secure Cusco, and Pizarro's decision to install Manco Inca as ruler stemmed from the Spaniard's desire to continue and perpetuate Inca internal discord.

Manco decided to join the Spanish side in hopes of strengthening his position in the dynastic struggle against survivors of the Atahualpa loyalist faction. A Spanish expedition led by Francisco Pizarro had captured the Inca capital of Cusco on November 15, 1533 after defeating an Inca army headed by general Quisquis. The following month, the conquistadors supported the official coronation of Manco Inca as Inca emperor to facilitate Spanish control over the Inca empire. Real power rested with the Spaniards and they frequently humiliated Manco when Juan Pizarro and Gonzalo Pizarro, two of Francisco's younger brothers, controlled the city. Juan Pizarro imprisoned Manco after he attempted an escape in November 1535. Hernando Pizarro assumed control of Cusco after returning from Spain and hoping to improve relations with Manco, for both personal and Spanish interests, released the Inca leader from confinement in January 1536. Manco remained under Spanish supervision but achieved greater freedom of movement. Manco Inca left Cusco on April 18, 1536 after securing Hernando Pizarro's approval to conduct religious ceremonial activities in the Yucay Valley and return with gold. Instead, Manco went to Lares and conducted a meeting with Inca military chiefs and warriors, over ceremonial chicha, to discuss and finalize siege and rebellion plans.

== Siege ==
Hernando, realizing the grave mistake, sent his brother Juan Pizarro and seventy cavalrymen from Cusco on a mission to disperse the Incas gathered in the nearby Yucay Valley. Juan Pizarro's expedition located a mass of Inca troops in the valley and cleared them out after a brief skirmish. The Spaniards secured the valley and remained in position for three or four days without facing any significant battles or coordinated Inca attacks. Juan quickly understood why he faced limited Inca resistance in the valley when a horseman dispatched by Hernando Pizarro informed Juan that Inca warriors had amassed on the hills surrounding Cusco. The Inca emperor did not attack Cusco at once; instead, he waited to assemble his full army, estimated at between 100,000 and 200,000 men, around the city (some sources suggest numbers as low as 40,000). Against them there were 190 Spaniards, 80 of them horsemen, and several thousand Indian auxiliaries. The Incas made their first move on May 5, 1536, by seizing the unoccupied Sacsayhuamán fortress above Cusco, which the Spaniards had vacated to fortify themselves in the city. Sacsayhuamán provided the Incas with high ground above the city and a favorable fortified position from which to launch offensive attacks. Additionally, the steep elevation encountered while approaching the fortress inhibited the use of cavalry, effectively neutralizing one of the Spaniards' primary tactical advantages and potential options for counter-assault. The siege started on May 6, 1536, with a full-scale attack towards the main square of the city; Inca warriors descended from Sacsayhuamán into the city and immediately secured the areas around Colcampata and Cora Cora and eventually succeeded in capturing most of the city. The Inca warriors barraged the city with slings projecting hot stones wrapped in cotton and incendiary arrows that ignited thatched roofs and quickly spread fire throughout Cusco. Meanwhile, the Spaniards took refuge in two large buildings near the main plaza, barricading themselves inside the hall of Suntur Huasi and Hatun Cancha, two buildings facing each other on the eastern side of the square. The conquistadors fended off Inca attacks from these constructions and mounted frequent raids against their besiegers. The raids, with moderate but short-term success, included small waves of cavalry and foot-soldier elements sent out to break the Inca ranks. The Incas recognized the significant battlefield effectiveness of horses, so the native warriors built elevated positions around the city manned by warriors who launched ayllos (bolas) to entangle and disable the cavalrymen.

Realizing the direness of the situation, after about a week of being pinned down, the Spanish decided their survival depended on recapturing the walled complex of Sacsayhuamán which served as the main base of operations for the Inca army. Pasac, a rival and relative of Manco who sided with the Spanish, devised a successful plan to assault the fortress. Fifty horsemen, led by Juan Pizarro and accompanied by Indian auxiliaries, broke through the Inca army files and burst off at a gallop toward Chinchaysuyo. The Spaniards continued northwest, feigning retreat toward Lima, which drew Inca warriors out from the fortress. Pizarro and his men then turned around and attacked Sacsayhuamán from outside the city. During the frontal assault against the building's large walls, a stone struck Juan Pizarro in the head; he died days later from the injury. The following day, the Spaniards resisted several Inca counterattacks and mounted a renewed assault at night using ladders. In this way, they captured the terrace walls of Sacsayhuamán while the Inca army held on to the two tall towers of the complex. The Inca commanders, Paucar Huaman and the high priest or Willaq Umu, decided to leave the confinement of the towers and fight their way towards Calca, the site of Manco Inca's headquarters, to bring back reinforcements. The attempt was successful and the towers were left under the command of Titu Cusi Gualpa, an Inca nobleman. Despite Titu's fierce resistance, the Spaniards and their auxiliaries stormed the towers so that when the Inca commanders returned, Sacsayhuamán was firmly under Spanish control.

The capture of Sacsayhuamán eased the pressure on the Spanish garrison at Cusco; the fighting now turned into a series of daily skirmishes interrupted only by the Inca religious tradition of halting attacks during the new moon. During this period, the Spaniards successfully implemented terror tactics to demoralize the Inca army, which included an order to kill any woman caught and cutting off the hands of captured men. Encouraged by their successes, Hernando Pizarro led an attack against Manco Inca's headquarters, which were now at Ollantaytambo, further away from Cusco. Manco Inca defeated the Spanish expedition at the Battle of Ollantaytambo by taking advantage of the fortifications and the difficult terrain around the site. The Spanish garrison had more success with several raids to gather food from regions near Cusco; these incursions allowed them to replenish their almost exhausted provisions. Meanwhile, Manco Inca tried to capitalize on his success at Ollantaytambo with a renewed assault on Cusco, but a Spanish cavalry party had a chance encounter with the Inca army, thus ruining any hope of surprise. That same night, the Spaniards mounted a full-scale attack which achieved complete surprise and inflicted severe casualties on Manco Inca's troops.

== Aftermath ==
After 10 months of vicious fighting in Cusco, with low morale playing a factor, Manco Inca decided to lift the siege of Cusco and withdraw to Ollantaytambo and then Vilcabamba, where he established the small Neo-Inca State. It is suggested by some that by this action he threw away his only real chance to expel the Spaniards from the lands of the Inca Empire, but it was probably the only realistic choice he had considering the arrival of Spanish reinforcements from Chile led by Diego de Almagro. Recognizing the opportunity of expanding his own reign into Peru, Almagro seized the city after achieving victory for Spain and had Hernando and Gonzalo Pizarro imprisoned. Gonzalo then escaped, to later defeat Almagro at the Battle of Las Salinas.

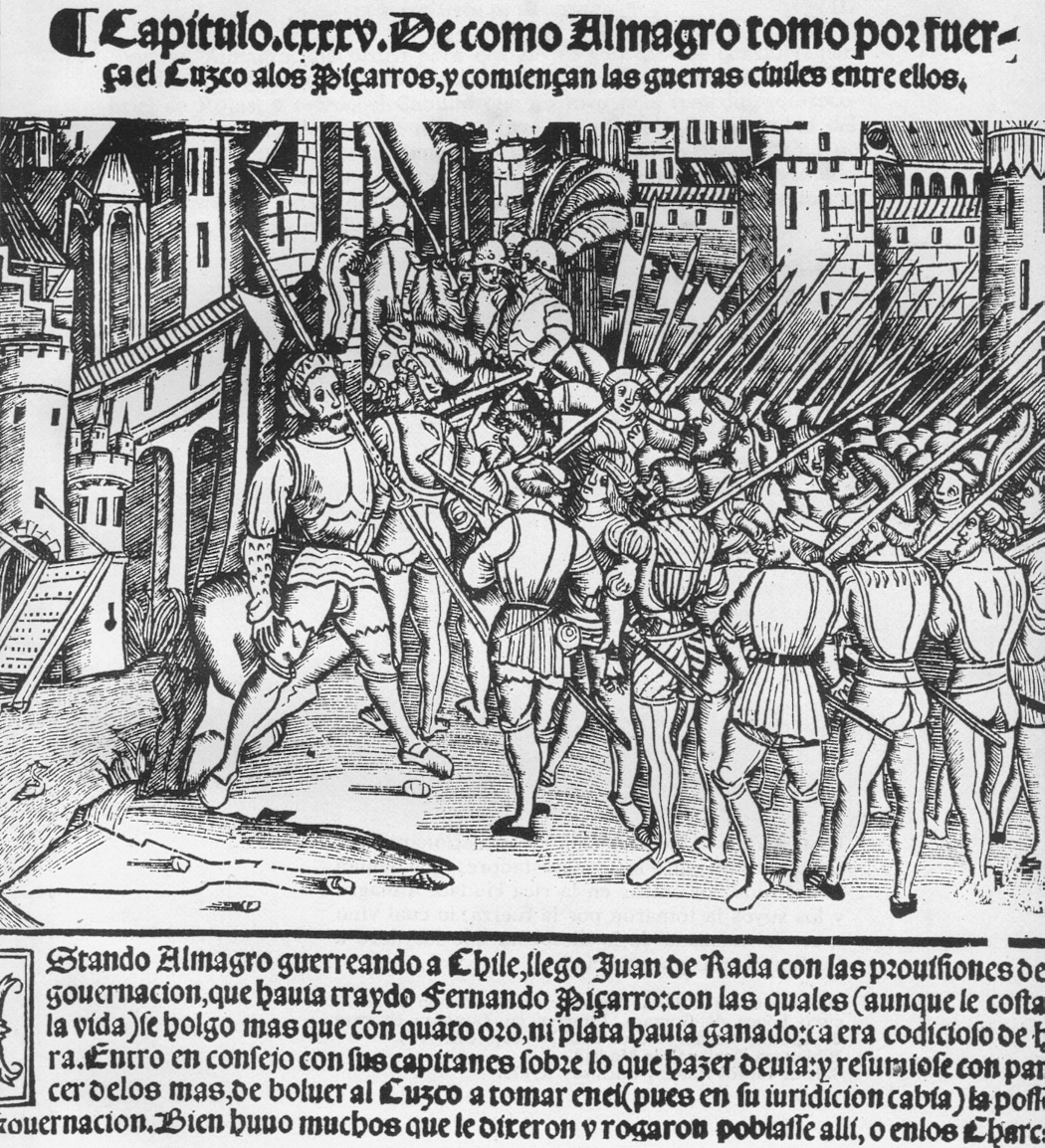
Almagro's forces take possession of Cusco
