= Francisca Pizarro Yupanqui =

Spanish-Inca princess, daughter of Francisco Pizarro

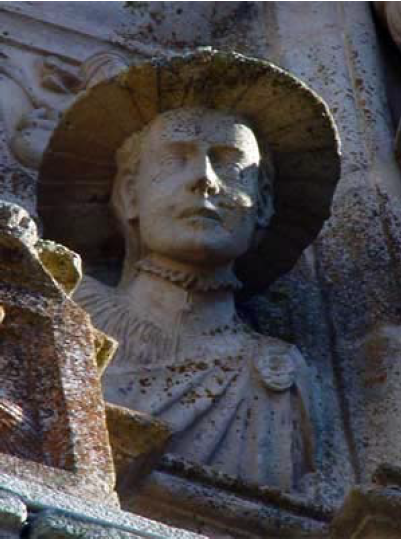
- Statue of Francisca Pizarro Yupanqui at the Palacio de la Conquista
- Born: December 28, 1534; Jauja, Governorate of New Castile
- Died: 1598 (aged 63–64); Trujillo, Spain
- Other name: Francisquita
- Known for: Peru's "first mestiza", Descendant of Inca emperors
- Spouses: Hernando Pizarro (1551-1580); Pedro Arias Portocarrero (After 1580 - )
- Parents: Francisco Pizarro (father); Quispe Sisa (mother)
- Relatives: Huayna Capac (Grandfather); Counthuacho (Grandmother); Huáscar (Uncle); Atahualpa (Uncle); Manco Inca Yupanqui (Uncle); Gonzalo Pizarro (Uncle); Hernando Pizarro (Uncle, Husband)

Francisca Pizarro Huaylas Yupanqui (December 28, 1534 – 1598) was a South American woman who was both a direct descendant of Inca emperors on her maternal line and the daughter of conquistador Francisco Pizarro. Today, she is remembered as Peru's "first mestiza".

== Early life ==
Francisca Pizarro Huaylas Yupanqui was born in 1534 in Jauja, in what was then the Spanish Empire's Governorate of New Castile, present-day Peru. Her father was the Spanish conquistador Francisco Pizarro, and her mother was the Inca princess Quispe Sisa. On her mother's side, she was the granddaughter of the Inca Emperor Huayna Capac and of the Huaylas kuraka Contarhuacho, niece of the emperors Huáscar, Atahualpa, and Manco Inca Yupanqui. She has since been remembered as Peru's "first mestiza," although that designation is unverifiable. She and her brother Gonzalo, who died in childhood, were recognized as the legitimate heirs of both Pizarro and the Inca royal family by Emperor Charles V in the real cédula in the mid-1530s.

The majority of Francisca's immediate family died during the Conquest of Peru, and she was given little opportunity to learn about her Inca heritage. She was primarily raised by her uncle and aunt, Francisco Martín de Alcántara and Inés Muñoz, and she was taught to read and write, dance, and play the clavichord. After the death of her father in 1541, Francisca, who was only 7 years old, was courted by the major Spanish nobles of Peru, including her 30-year-old uncle Gonzalo Pizarro. It was believed they would make a powerful couple with the ability to crown themselves king and queen of Peru, as the Royal Council of the Indies feared. However, as part of the Spanish Crown's strategy to pacify Peru, the Pizarros were deported to Europe, including Francisca; Gonzalo lost favor and was subsequently defeated and beheaded at the Battle of Jaquijahuana.

== Life at court ==
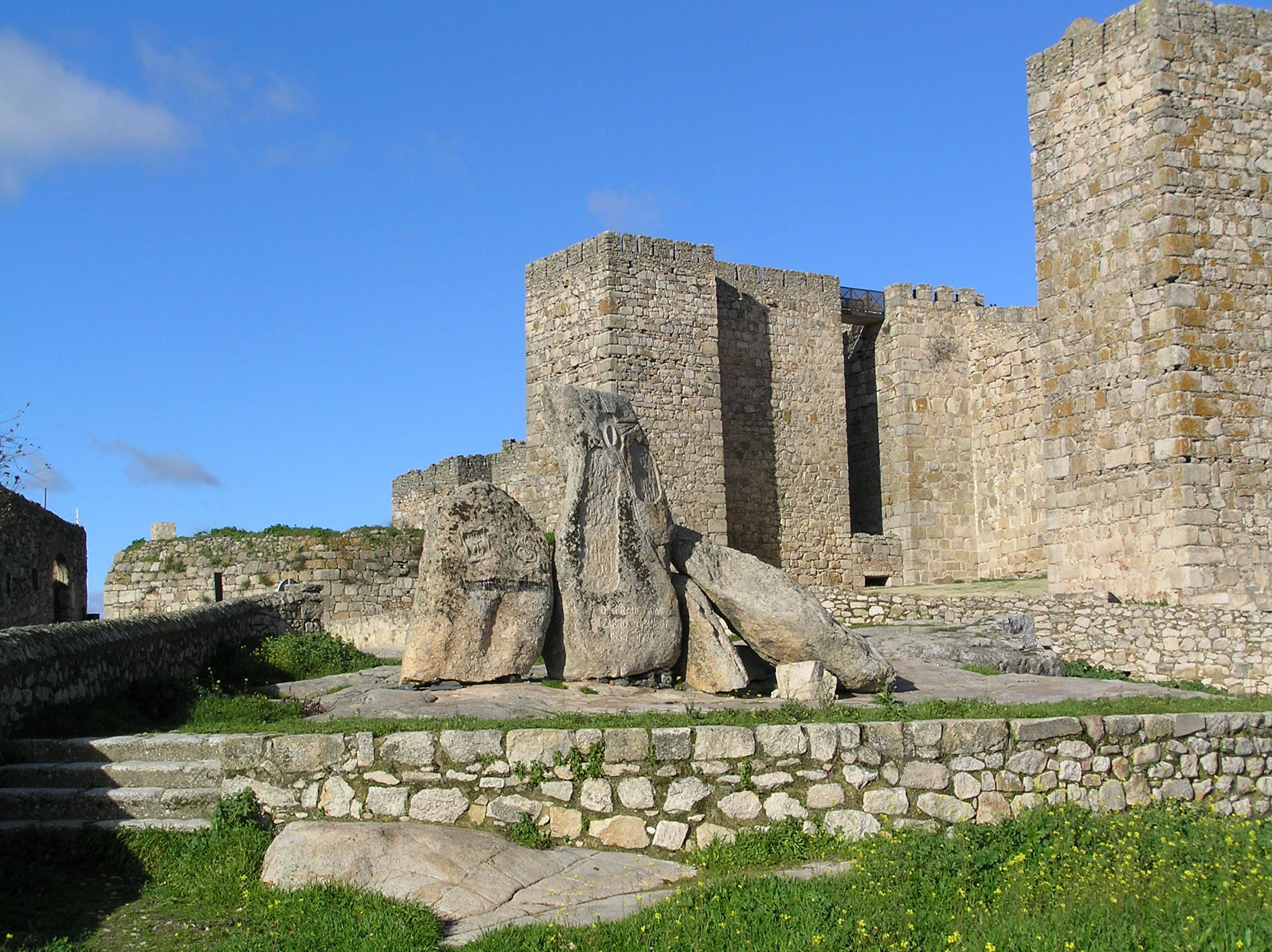
A monument to Francisca Pizarro at the Castillo de Trujillo

Francisca was brought to Spain in 1551, accompanied by her stepfather Francisco de Ampuero, the mayor of Lima and her mother's second husband. There, she was married in her late teens to her uncle Hernando Pizarro, who was some 30 years her senior. The couple lived at La Mota Castle in northwestern Spain, where Hernando was imprisoned, and had five children, Francisco, Juan, Gonzalo, Isabel, and Inés, almost all of whom died at a young age. After Hernando's death around 1580, Francisca married the much younger aristocrat Pedro Arias Portocarrero, the son of the count of Puñonrostro, and moved to the court of Madrid.

In Spain, she became known as Francisquita and immersed herself in courtly life. She promoted the construction of the Palacio de la Conquista in Trujillo, Spain, the Metropolitan Cathedral of Lima, and the Convento de la Merced de Trujillo, among other works. She died in Trujillo in 1598.

== In popular culture ==
- Various books have been written about Francisca Pizarro Yupanqui, including the 2023 work of historic fiction Francisca, Princesa del Perú by Alonso Cueto.
- Renata Flores wrote and performed a song called "Francisca Pizarro" on her album Isqun.

== Bibliography ==
- María Rostworowski: Doña Francisca Pizarro: una ilustre mestiza 1534-1598. Lima: IEP, 1994.
- María Luisa López Rol: Doña Francisca Pizarro Yupanqui en el Archivo de Protocolos de Trujillo. Badajoz: Fundación Obra Pía de los Pizarro, 2014.
- Alonso Cueto: Francisca: Princesa del Perú. Lima: Penguin Random House, 2023
- Carmen Sánchez-Risco: La primera mestiza. Madrid: HarperCollins Ibérica, 2023
