= Quispe Sisa =

Inca princess

Quispe Sisa (c. 1518 – 1559), also known as Inés Huaylas Yupanqui, was an Inca princess, daughter of the Sapa Inca Huayna Capac. She played a role in the Spanish conquest of the Inca Empire. The Palace of the Conquest in Trujillo, Spain features busts of her, her daughter Francisca Pizarro Yupanqui, Francisco Pizarro and her daughter's husband, Hernando Pizarro.

== Biography ==
She was the daughter of the Sapa Inca Huayna Capac and one of his secondary wives – the curaca of Huaylas, Contarhuacho. She was baptized as Inés Huaylas Yupanqui when she was married via common law at a young age to conquistador Francisco Pizarro, as conquerors did with the women of the royal families they conquered and subordinated. In 1534, she gave birth to Francisca Pizarro Yupanqui, and to Gonzalo Pizarro the following year; however, Gonzalo died young. She cohabited with Pizarro until 1537. Separated from Pizarro in 1538, she lost custody of her Pizarro children and Francisca Pizarro Yupanqui was exiled to Spain in 1551. Quispe Sisa then married Conquistador Francisco de Ampuero. Between 1538 and 1541, she gave birth to three more children – Martín Alonso de Ampuero, Josefa de Ampuero and Francisco de Ampuero.

=== Siege of Lima ===
During the siege of Lima, led by Manco Inca Yupanqui, Quispe Sisa sent several runners with messages to her mother in Huaylas, asking for help. On September 12, 1536, her mother, Contarhuacho, sent in an army to help Pizarro defend Lima.
