= Palacio de la Conquista =

Historic site in Spain

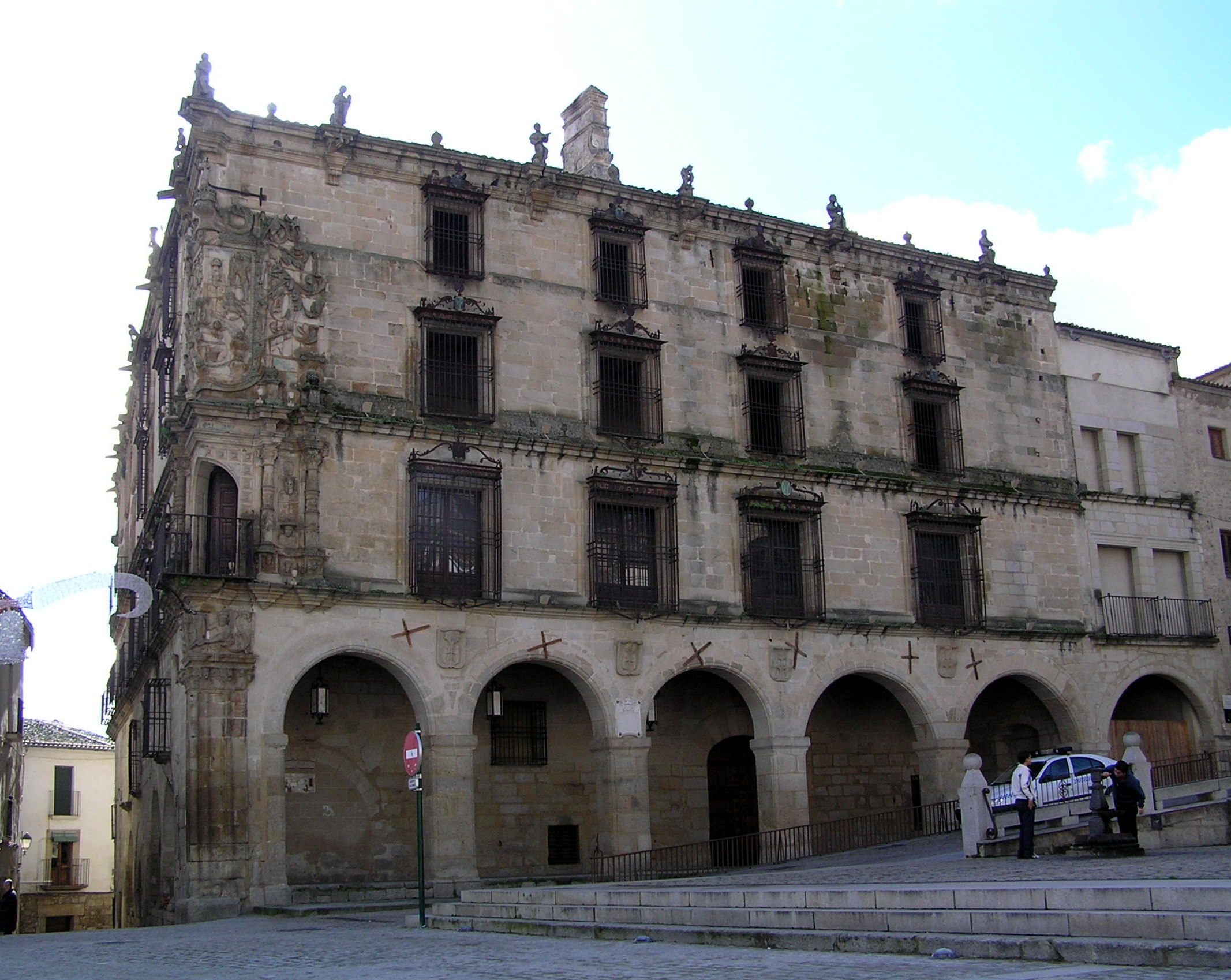
- Interactive map of Palacio de la Conquista
- 39.4602°N 5.8818°W
- Location: Trujillo, Spain

History
- Built: 1560s

Site notes
- Architectural style: Renaissance

Spanish Cultural Heritage
- Official name: Casa-palacio del Marqués de la Conquista
- Type: Non-movable
- Criteria: Monument
- Designated: November 27, 1987
- Reference no.: RI-51-0005033

The Palacio de la Conquista, also known as the Palacio de los marqueses de la Conquista or as the Palacio del escudo, is a renaissance-style building located at the main square of the Spanish city of Trujillo, Cáceres, Extremadura.

== History ==
It was built in the 16th century, construction having begun in 1562 by order of Hernando Pizarro and his wife and niece, Francisca Pizarro Yupanqui, daughter of Francisco Pizarro, following the instructions included in the latter's will, which were: "found and build a church." "and chaplaincy in the city of Truxillo, which is in the Kingdoms of Spain where I am natural and born."

It was restored in the 18th century owing to the delicate state of the building, which threatened to collapse. The works were carried out by the architect Manuel de Lara Churriguera, a member of the clan that gave its name to the Churrigueresque style and nephew of José de Churriguera, its greatest exponent.

Its name comes from the noble title of Marquisate of the Conquest, which the Pizarro family received for their leading role in the campaign to conquer Peru.

Among its architectural elements is a huge balcony at one corner, crowned by an immense shield, where, flanked by the arms of Charles V, there are several allegorical motifs of the conquest of Peru and the coat of arms of the Pizarro family.

== See also ==
- Palacio de Pizarro
