= Juan Pizarro (conquistador) =

Spanish conquistador (1511–1536)

Juan Pizarro y Alonso (Spanish: [xwam piˈθaro]; born c. 1511 in Trujillo; died July 1536) was a Spanish conquistador who accompanied his brothers Francisco, Gonzalo and Hernando Pizarro for the conquest of Peru in 1532.

== Biography ==
Juan Pizarro was the illegitimate son of Captain Gonzalo Pizarro y Rodríguez de Aguilar (senior) (1446–1522) and María Alonso, from Trujillo. His father was a colonel of infantry who had served with distinction in the Italian campaigns under Gonzalo Fernández de Córdoba, and in Navarre. Juan Pizarro was the half brother of Francisco and Hernando Pizarro, and full brother to Gonzalo Pizarro.

Juan and his brothers, led by Francisco and friend Diego de Almagro, conquered the mighty Inca Empire in 1533, not only by virtue of being heavily armed but also as smallpox was spread among the natives, killing many. Juan, and Gonzalo Pizarro, were then appointed regidores on 24 March 1534, and garrisoned the city of Cuzco with ninety men, while Francisco Pizarro departed for Jauja.

In early Feb. 1536, two hundred thousand Incan warriors laid siege to the two hundred Spaniards in Cuzco. Hernando, Gonzalo and Juan led the defense with counterattacks on the fortress overlooking the city. Juan led the attack to recover the citadel. Unable to wear a helmet (his jaw was swollen after being hit by a sling), Juan was struck in the head by a large stone and died two weeks later.

== Ancestors ==
Ancestors of Juan Pizarro y Alonso

16.
8. Fernando or Hernándo Alonso de Hinojosa
17.
4. Fernando Alonso Pizarro
18.
9. Teresa Martínez Pizarro
19.
2. Gonzalo Pizarro y Rodríguez de Aguilar
20.
10.
21.
5. Isabel de Vargas y Rodríguez de Aguilar
22.
11.
23.
1. Juan Pizarro y Alonso
24.
12.
25.
6.
26.
13.
27.
3. María Alonso
28.
14.
29.
7.
30.
15.
31.
