= Hernando Pizarro =

16th-century Spanish conquistador

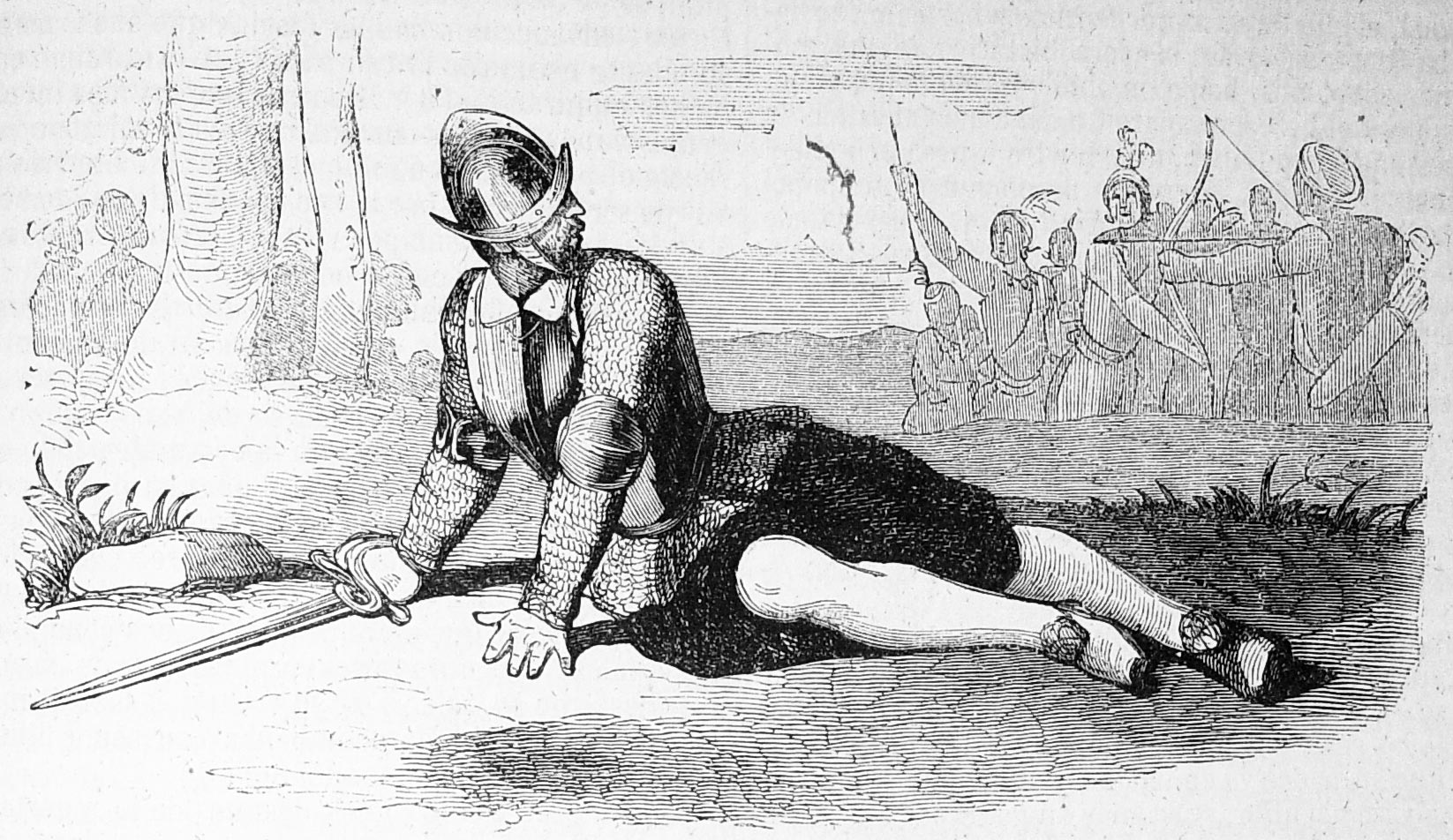
- A steel etched print of Hernando Pizarro
- Born: Hernando Pizarro c. 1504; Trujillo, Extremadura, Spain
- Died: c. 1578 (aged 73–74); Trujillo, Extremadura, Spain
- Burial place: San Francisco Church, Trujillo
- Spouse: Francisca Pizarro Yupanqui
- Children: 5
- Relatives: Pizarro brothers
- Military career
- Allegiance: Spain
- Rank: Captain
- Nickname: lima
- Conflicts: Conflicts: Italian Wars; War of the League of Cambrai; Spanish conquest of Navarre; Spanish Conquest of the Inca Empire; Battle of Puná; Battle of Cajamarca; Siege of Cusco; Battle of Ollantaytambo; Battle of Las Salinas
- Awards: Knight of the Order of Santiago

Hernando Pizarro y de Vargas (Spanish: [eɾˈnando piˈθaro]; c. 1504 – c. 1578) was a Spanish conquistador and one of the Pizarro brothers who ruled over Peru. He was the only one of the Pizarro brothers who was not killed in Peru, and eventually returned to Spain.

== Pizarro Brothers ==
As one of the Pizarro brothers he was related to Francisco, Juan and Gonzalo Pizarro. He had two full sisters, Inés Pizarro y de Vargas and Isabel Pizarro y de Vargas, married to Gonzalo de Tapia. Through his father he was a second cousin of Hernán Cortés.

== Inca Empire ==
Starting in 1532 and succeeding in 1533, Francisco Pizarro conquered the Inca Empire and claimed what we know today as Peru for Spain. In the 16th century the Incas were conquered by the Spaniards, Hernando Pizarro, who was the brother of the chief commander of the conquest Francisco Pizarro, writes a letter to the royal audience of Santo Domino about the expedition. Hernando Pizarro wrote this letter on November 1533. Hernando Pizarro starts his letter by explaining how the government founded a town called San Miguel and then proceeded to search for the town of Cajamarca whose rulers have been fighting. In this letter, we get a better understanding of what type of person Hernando Pizarro was. In the letter, Hernando gives a description image of his surroundings while on the expedition "The road over the mountains is a thing worth seeing, because, though the ground is so rugged, such beautiful roads could not in truth be found throughout Christendom. The greater part of them is paved. There is a bridge of stone or wood over every stream. We found bridges of network over a very large and powerful river, which we crossed twice, which was a marvelous thing to see."

== The New World ==
Unlike his other brothers he was born in wedlock, and he was educated and gained influence in the Spanish court. In 1530 Hernando departed for the New World with his half-brother Francisco Pizarro and accompanied him during his conquests in Peru. In 1533 Hernando was sent back to Spain with the royal fifth for the Emperor, which consisted of "a number of the most beautiful articles" collected for Atahuallpa's ransom.

Hernando arrived Seville on 9 January, 1534, proceeded to Calatayud and an audience with Charles. Hernando delivered the royal fifth and recounted the Pizarro brothers' adventures. Charles confirmed Francisco Pizarro's previous grants, extending them seventy leagues further south, and then gave Francisco's partner, Diego de Almagro, a grant two hundred leagues further south.

When he returned to Peru he ruled with his other half-brothers (Juan and Gonzalo Pizarro) over the prized Inca capital of Cuzco. Governing with an iron fist, he helped with the eventual suppression of Inca uprisings led by Manco Inca.

== Cuzco ==
After Diego de Almagro returned from Chile from a fruitless gold-seeking expedition, he found that Hernando and his brothers were in control of Cuzco. However, as he had not obtained any credit for having been Francisco Pizarro's main partner in discovering Peru, he decided to claim Cuzco as part of his share. Almagro seized the city in 1537, capturing Hernando and Juan. Hernando was eventually released after negotiations between Almagro and Francisco, and in 1538 he and Gonzalo returned with an army to confront Almagro. In the ensuing Battle of Las Salinas, the Pizarros won a decisive victory, capturing Almagro and the city.

The execution of Almagro later that year and the general disorder caused by the Spanish infighting caused substantial fallout in the Spanish court. Hernando was again called upon to leverage his royal contacts: in 1539 he returned to Spain to lobby in favor of the Pizarros. Their perceived treachery was too great, however, and despite Hernando's bribery, he was imprisoned for the next twenty years, from June 1541 until May 1561, in the Castle of La Mota. He then lived in his Trujillo palace until his death in 1578.

== Family ==
In 1552 Hernando married his niece, the 17-year-old Francisca Pizarro Yupanqui (the daughter of Francisco Pizarro and his Inca mistress Inés Yupanqui) in Spain. Although born out of wedlock, Francisca was legitimized by Imperial Decree. They had five children. One of their sons, Francisco Pizarro y Pizarro, married twice and had offspring, the Marqueses de La Conquista. As a result, the Pizarro line survived Hernando's death, though it is now extinct in the male line.

His father was a son of Fernando Alonso Pizarro and his wife, Isabel de Vargas Rodríguez de Aguilar, paternal grandson of Fernando or Hernando Alonso de Hinojosa and his wife, Teresa Martínez Pizarro, and brother of Juan Pizarro, who died without issue in 1521, and Diego Fernández Pizarro, who married Marina López and had a son Fernando Pizarro López, who had a natural son named Diego Pizarro de Vargas, married to Juana Rodríguez de Bobadilla, with female issue in Portugal.

== Ancestors ==
Ancestors of Hernando Pizarro de Vargas

16.
8. Fernando or Hernando Alonso de Hinojosa
17.
4. Fernando Alonso Pizarro
18.
9. Teresa Martínez Pizarro
19.
2. Gonzalo Pizarro y Rodríguez de Aguilar
20.
10.
21.
5. Isabel de Vargas y Rodríguez de Aguilar
22.
11.
23.
1. Hernando Pizarro de Vargas
24.
12.
25.
6.
26.
13.
27.
3. Isabel de Vargas
28.
14.
29.
7.
30.
15.
31.
