= Ñawpa Pacha =

Academic Journal of Andean Archaeology

Ñawpa Pacha, Journal of Andean Archaeology
- Discipline: Archaeology
- Language: English, Spanish
- Edited by: Robyn Cutright

Publication details
- History: 1963-present
- Publisher: Taylor & Francis on behalf of the Institute of Andean Studies
- Frequency: Biannually

Standard abbreviations
- ISO 4: Ñawpa Pacha

Indexing
- ISSN: 0077-6297 (print); 2051-6207 (web)
- LCCN: 79649238
- JSTOR: 00776297
- OCLC no.: 301311969

Links
- Journal homepage; Online access; Online archive; Journal page at Institute of Andean Studies website

Ñawpa Pacha, Journal of Andean Archaeology is a semi-annual, peer-reviewed, academic journal published by Taylor & Francis on behalf of the Institute of Andean Studies (Berkeley, California). Ñawpa Pacha means "Antiquity" in Quechua. It was established by John Howland Rowe in 1963.

The journal's current editor-in-chief since 2023 is Robyn Cutright. Jerry Moore was editor-in-chief from 2011-2022

== Scope ==
Articles published in Ñawpa Pacha cover topics such archaeology, history, linguistics, ethnology and biology of ancient cultures from the Andes of South America.

== Abstracting and indexing ==
The journal is abstracted and indexed in IBZ Online, Anthropological Literature, Hispanic American Periodicals Index, JournalTOCs and Latindex.
