= Baltasar de Ocampo Conejeros =

Spanish official

Baltasar de Ocampo Conejeros was a Spanish official in the Viceroyalty of Peru from about 1567. In 1611, he wrote a report on the conquest of the city and province of Vilcabamba in 1572. At the time of his writing he was living in poverty in Lima. He addressed his report to the viceroy, Juan de Mendoza y Luna, in hopes of receiving financial support. He claims to have served Kings Philip II and Philip III for 44 years. In 1604, Ocampo is known to have sold land in Pucyura.

Ocampo's 1611 report, entitled Descripción de la provincia de Sant Francisco de la Victoria de Villcapampa, survives in a single manuscript, now Add. 17585 in the British Library. It is 63 pages long, including a three-page cover letter. It is an important source for the final years of the Neo-Inca State and its fall. It is the only source to recount the slave revolt led by Francisco Chichima around 1608.

Four other reports by Ocampo are known:

- La petición de los soldados para volver a Vilcabamba (1582)
- El testimonio de Baltasar de Ocampo Conejeros en apoyo de Martín Hurtado de Arbieto (1590), a defence of Martín Hurtado de Arbieto
- El testimonio sobre la muerte de Fray Diego Ortiz (1600), an account of the martyrdom of Diego Ruiz Ortiz
- El testimonio de Baltasar de Ocampo Conejeros en apoyo de Martín Hurtado de Arbieto y Miguel de Otaça de Mondragón (1601)
