= Battle of Ollantaytambo =

Battle in the Spanish conquest of the Inca Empire

- Part of Spanish conquest of Peru
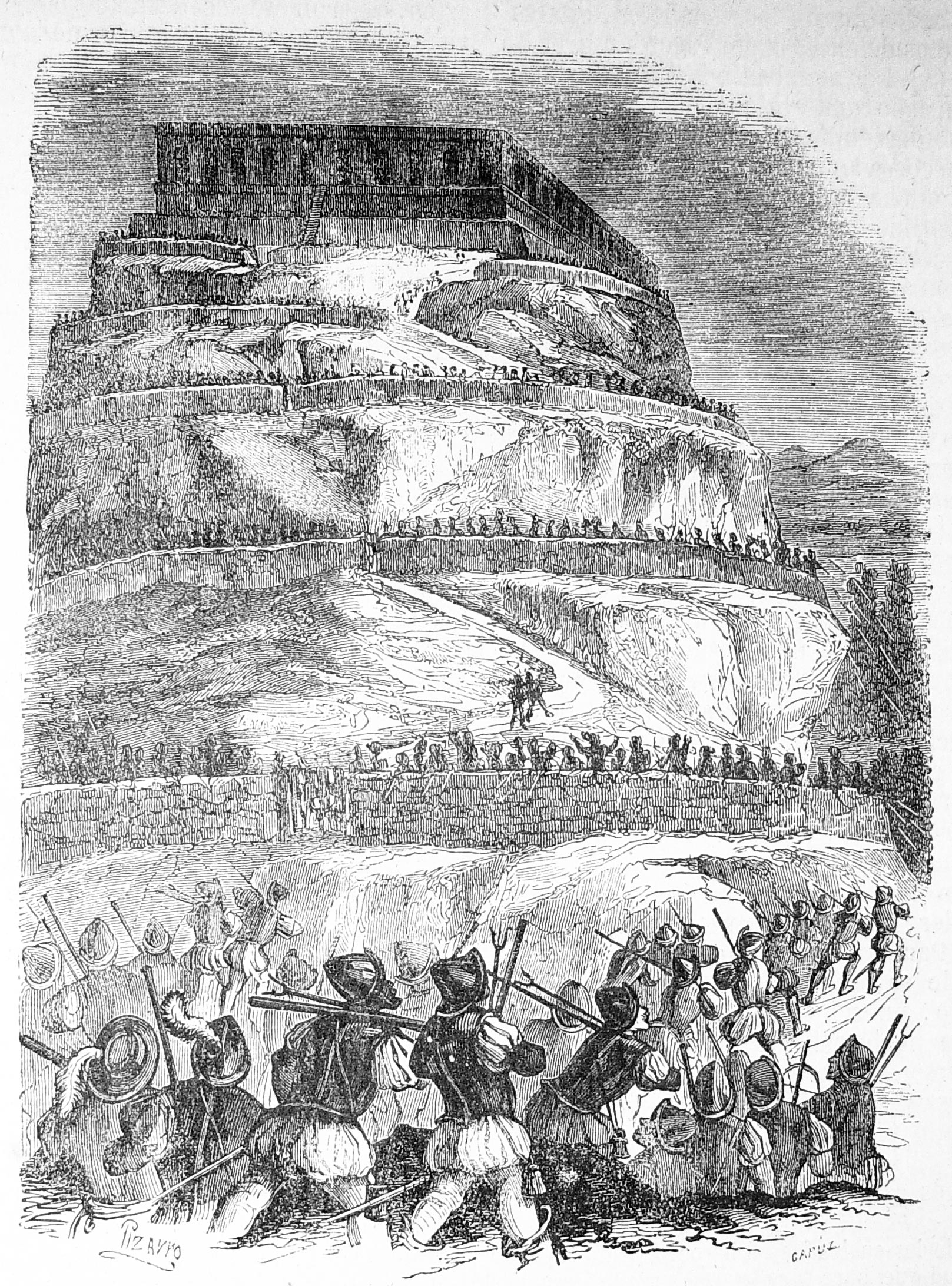
- Engraving from the history of William H. Prescott depicting the clash between the Inca army and the Spanish conquerors at Ollantaytambo
| Date | January, 1537 |
| Location | Ollantaytambo, Peru 13°15′29″S 72°15′48″W |
| Result | Incan victory; Establishment of the Neo-Inca State |

Belligerents
| Remnants of the Inca Empire | Spanish Empire |

Commanders and leaders
| Manco Inca | Hernando Pizarro; Gonzalo Pizarro |

Strength
| 20,000 Incan Army | 100 Spaniards; 30,000 Indian auxiliaries Dozens of Black soldiers |

Casualties and losses
| Unknown | ~7,000–20,000 killed |
- Location within Peru

The Battle of Ollantaytambo (Spanish: Batalla de Ollantaytambo, IPA: [baˈtaʎa ðe oʎantajˈtambo]) took place in January 1537, between the forces of Inca emperor Manco Inca and a Spanish expedition led by Hernando Pizarro during the Spanish conquest of Peru. A former ally of the Spaniards, Manco Inca rebelled in May 1536, and besieged a Spanish garrison in the city of Cusco. To end the stand-off, the besieged mounted a raid against the emperor's headquarters in the town of Ollantaytambo. The expedition, commanded by Hernando Pizarro, included 100 Spaniards and some 30,000 Indian auxiliaries against an Inca army of more than 20,000.

There is some controversy over the actual location of the battle; according to some, it took place in the town itself, while Jean-Pierre Protzen and John Hemming argue that the nearby plain of Mascabamba better matches the descriptions of the encounter. In any case, the Inca army managed to defend against the Spanish forces from a set of high terraces and flooded their position by channeling water from the Urubamba River, which greatly hindered the Spanish cavalry. Severely pressed and unable to advance, the Spaniards withdrew by night to Cusco. Despite this victory, the arrival of Spanish reinforcements to Cusco forced Manco Inca to abandon Ollantaytambo and seek refuge in the heavily forested region of Vilcabamba, where he established the small independent Neo-Inca State which survived until 1572.

== Prelude ==
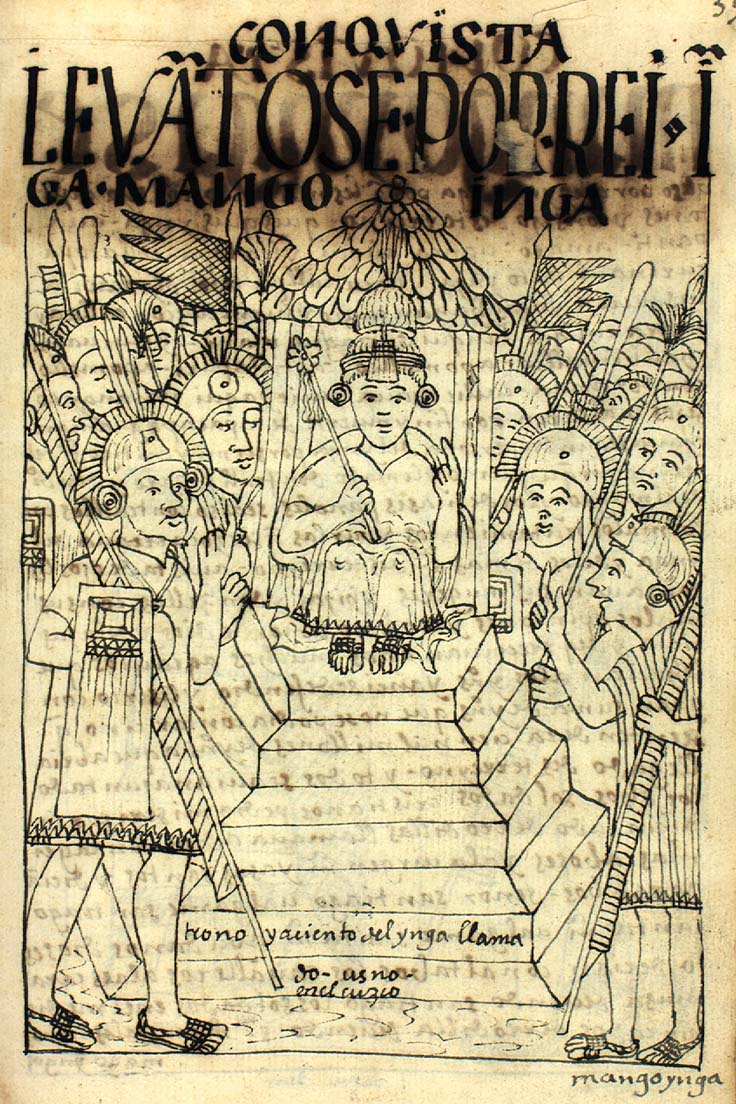
The crowning of Manco Inca as depicted in the chronicle of Guaman Poma

In 1531, a group of Spaniards led by Francisco Pizarro landed on the shores of the Inca Empire, thus starting the Spanish conquest of Peru. At that time the empire was emerging from a civil war in which Atahualpa had defeated his brother Huascar to claim the title of Sapa Inca. Atahualpa underestimated the strength of the small force of Spaniards and was captured during an ambush at Cajamarca in November 1532. Pizarro ordered the execution of the emperor in July 1533, and occupied the Inca capital of Cusco four months later. To replace Atahualpa, Pizarro installed his brother Túpac Huallpa as a puppet ruler, but he died shortly afterwards. Another brother, Manco Inca, was crowned in his place. During this stage, Atahualpa's generals were the only opposition to the Spanish advance as a sizable part of the empire's population had fought on Huascar's side during the civil war and joined Pizarro against their enemies.

For a while, Manco Inca and the conquistadors maintained cordial relations, together they defeated Atahualpa's generals and reestablished Inca rule over most of the empire. However, Manco came to realize that real authority rested in Spanish hands when his house was looted with impunity by a Spaniard mob in 1535. Following this episode, the Inca emperor was subject to constant harassment as the Spaniards demanded gold, took away his wives, and even imprisoned him. In response, he fled his capital to start an uprising. In May 1536, an Inca army besieged Cusco, which was garrisoned by a group of Spaniards and native allies. The conquistadors were hard pressed but they managed to resist and counterattack, storming the main Inca stronghold at Sacsayhuaman. Meanwhile, Manco's generals occupied the central highlands of Peru and annihilated several expeditions sent to reinforce Cusco but failed in their attempt to take the recently founded Spanish capital of Lima. As a result of these events, neither side was able to break the deadlock at Cusco for several months, so the Spaniard garrison decided to make a direct attack on Manco's headquarters at the town of Ollantaytambo, 70 kilometers (43 mi) northwest of the city.

== Sources ==
Primary sources about the battle of Ollantaytambo were written mainly by Spaniards. Pedro Pizarro, a cousin of Francisco Pizarro, was part of the expedition against Manco Inca's headquarters. Years later he wrote down his recollections of these and other events in a chronicle called Relación del descubrimiento y conquista de los reinos del Perú, completed in 1571. The anonymous Relación del sitio del Cuzco y principio de las guerras civiles del Perú hasta la muerte de Diego de Almagro starts in January 1536 when Hernando Pizarro arrived in Cusco, and ends with the execution of Diego de Almagro in July 1538. This chronicle, which includes an account of Manco Inca's rebellion and the attack on Ollantaytambo, was written in 1539 probably by Diego de Silva, a Spanish soldier who was actually in Lima during the uprising. An account of the battle was also included in the Historia general de los hechos de los Castellanos en las islas y tierra firme del Mar Oceano, written by Antonio de Herrera y Tordesillas between 1610 and 1615. Herrera was the Cronista Mayor de las Indias (Chronicler-in-Chief of the Indies) of the Spanish Crown and despite writing in Madrid, had access to many documents and sources. On the Inca side, the only written account of the battle is included in the Relación de la conquista del Perú y hechos del Inca Manco II, written in 1570 by Titu Cusi Yupanqui, son of Manco Inca.

== Order of battle ==
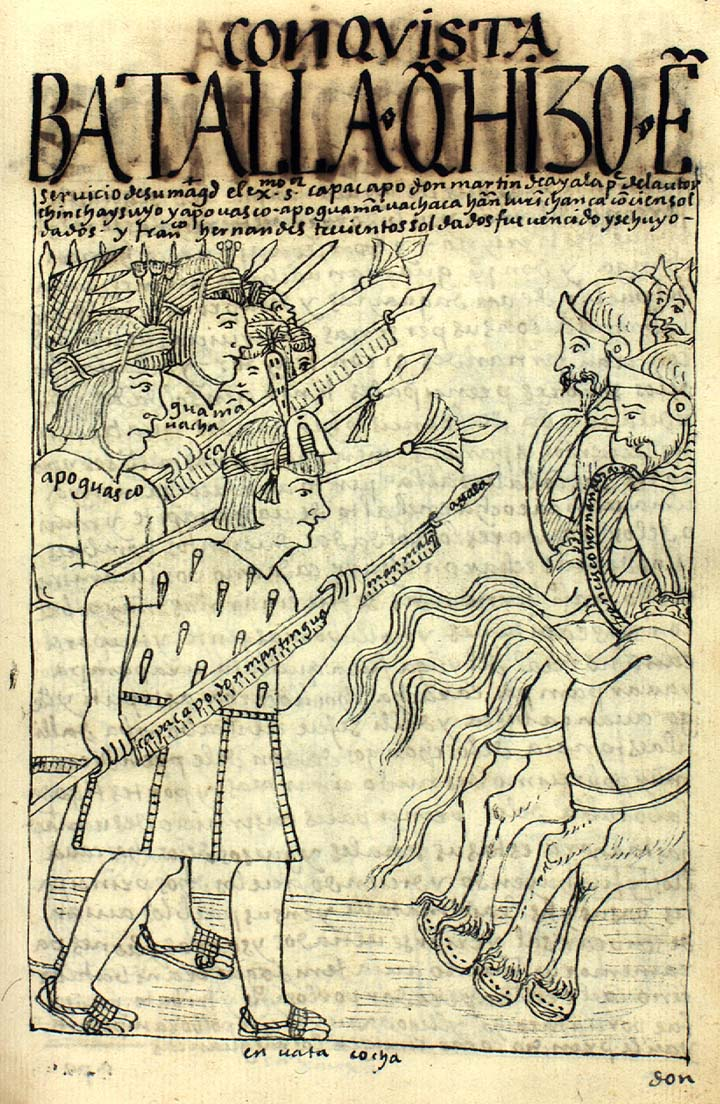
Combat between Inca and Spanish forces as depicted by Guaman Poma

Manco Inca had gathered more than 20,000 troops at Ollantaytambo, among them, a large number of recruits from tribes of the Amazon rainforest. Manco Inca's forces were a militia army made up mostly of conscripted farmers with only rudimentary weapons training. This was the regular fare in the Inca Empire, where military service was a duty for all married men between 25 and 50 years old. In combat, these soldiers were organized according to their ethnic group and led into battle by their native leaders, called kurakas. They used melee weapons such as maces, clubs, and spears, as well as ranged weapons such as arrows, javelins, and slings; protective gear included helmets, shields, and quilted cloth armor. Against the conquistadors, wooden clubs and maces with stone or bronze heads were rarely able to penetrate Spanish armor; slings and other missile throwing weapons were somewhat more effective due to their accuracy and the large size of their projectiles. Even so, Inca soldiers were no match for the Spanish cavalry in open terrain so they resorted to fighting on rough terrain and digging pits in open fields to hinder the mobility of horses.

The attack was led by Hernando Pizarro, the senior Spanish commander in Cusco, with a force of 100 Spaniards (30 infantry, 70 cavalry) and an estimated 30,000 native allies. One of his main assets against the Inca armies was the Spanish cavalry because horses provided a considerable advantage in hitting power, maneuverability, speed, and stamina over Inca warriors. All Spaniards wore some kind of armor, the most commonly used types were chain mail shirts and padded cloth armor which were lighter and cheaper than full armor suits; they were complemented by steel helmets and small iron or wooden shields. The main Spanish offensive weapon was the steel sword, which horsemen supplemented with the lance; both weapons could easily penetrate the padded armor worn by Inca troops. Firearms, such as arquebuses were rarely used during the Spanish conquest of Peru because they were scarce, hard to use, and despised by horsemen as an ungentlemanly weapon. Spaniards relied heavily on Indian auxiliaries because they provided thousands of warriors as well as support personnel and supplies. These native troops had the same sorts of arms and armor as their Inca counterparts. During the Ollantaytambo campaign, the Pizarro expedition included thousands of auxiliaries, mainly Cañaris, Chachapoyas, and Wankas, as well as several members of the Inca nobility opposed to Manco Inca.

== Battle ==
The main access route to Ollantaytambo runs along a narrow valley formed in the mountains by the Urubamba River, which connects the site with Machu Picchu to the west and with Pisaq and Cusco to the east. After his uprising, Manco Inca fortified the eastern approaches to fend off attacks from the former Inca capital, now under Spanish occupation. The first line of defense was a steep bank of terraces at Pachar, near the confluence of the Anta and Urubamba rivers. Behind it, the Incas channeled the Urubamba to make it cross the valley from right to left and back thus forming two more lines backed by the fortifications of Choqana on the left bank and 'Inkapintay on the right bank. Past them, at the plain of Mascabamba, eleven high terraces closed the valley between the mountains and a deep canyon formed by the Urubamba. The only way to continue was through the gate of T'iyupunku, a thick defensive wall with two narrow doorways. In the event of these fortifications being overrun, the Temple Hill, a religious center surrounded by high terraces overlooking Ollantaytambo, provided a last line of defense.

Faced with these constraints, the Spanish expedition had to cross the river several times and fight at each ford against stiff opposition. The bulk of the Inca army confronted the Spaniards from a set of terraces overlooking a plain by the Urubamba River. Several Spanish assaults against the terraces failed against a shower of arrows, slingshots, and boulders coming down from the terraces as well as from both flanks. To hinder the efforts of the Spanish cavalry, the Incas flooded the plain using previously prepared channels; water eventually reached the horses' girths. The defenders then counterattacked; some of them used Spanish weapons captured in previous encounters such as swords, bucklers, armor, and even a horse, ridden by Manco Inca himself. In a severely compromised situation, Hernando Pizarro ordered a retreat. Hernando's plan was to withdraw his army in an orderly manner, but the pursuit by the Incas drove the Spaniards to despair, turning the retreat into a rout. The Spaniards fled, abandoning their indigenous allies along the way, who were then massacred by the pursuing Inca soldiers. The pursuit was so fierce that another relative of the conquistador Francisco Pizarro, his cousin Pedro Pizarro, was on the verge of being killed by Inca warriors when his horse died, and had to be saved by two horsemen who came to his aid.

The victory had been so decisive that, the following day, a Cusco detachment that set out in pursuit of the retreating rivals found the Spanish camp completely deserted. The chronicle of Titu Cusi Yupanqui recounts that the Cusco warriors laughed loudly upon seeing that the Spaniards had fled in terror.

== Battle site ==
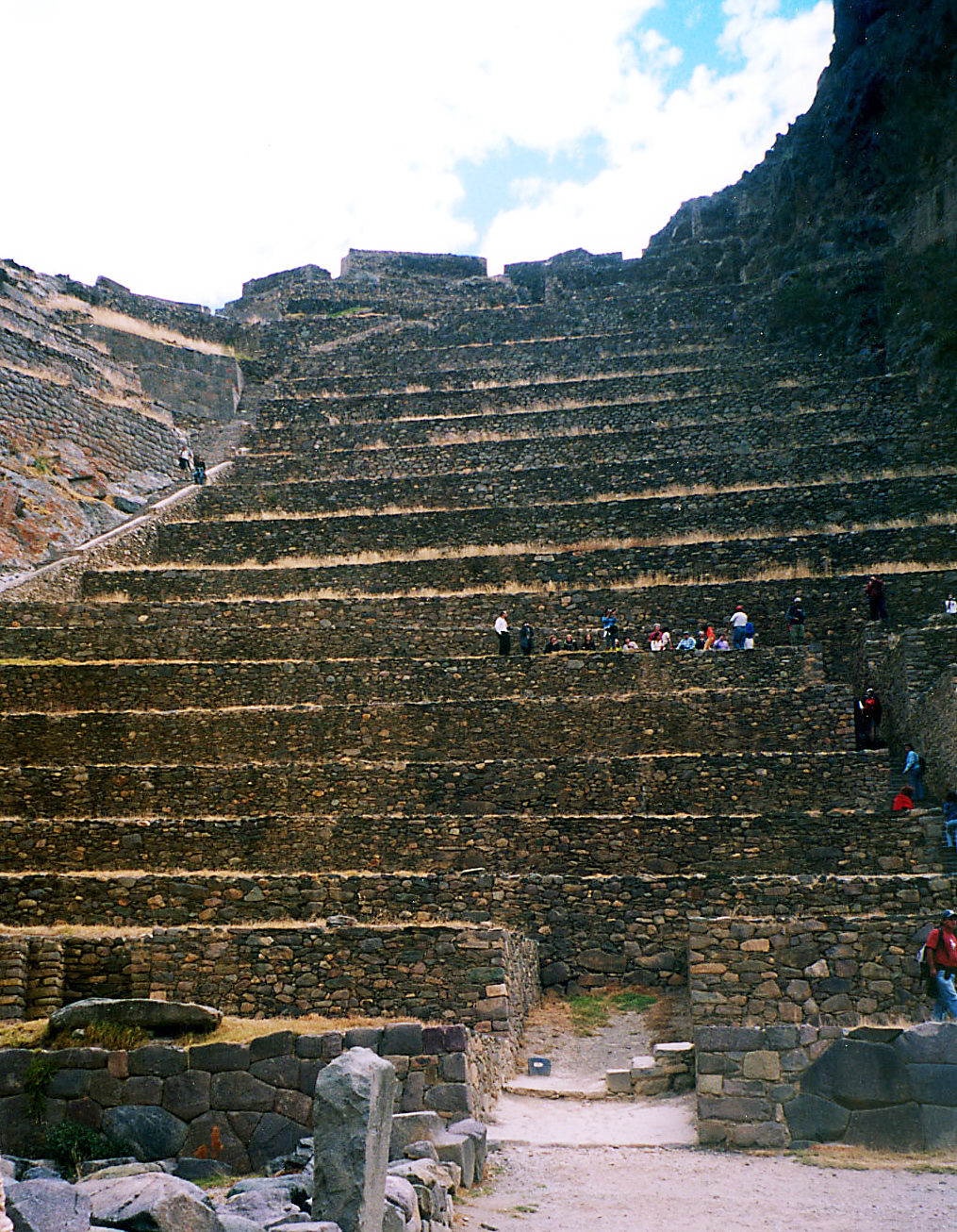
Inca terraces at Ollantaytambo

The actual location of the battle is the subject of some controversy. According to Canadian explorer John Hemming, Spanish forces occupied a plain between Ollantaytambo and the Urubamba River while the main Inca army was located on a citadel (the Temple Hill) overlooking the town, protected by seventeen terraces. However, Swiss architect Jean-Pierre Protzen argues that the topography of the town and its surrounding area does not match contemporary descriptions of the battle. An anonymous account, attributed to Diego de Silva, claims that the Inca army occupied a set of eleven terraces, not seventeen; while the chronicle of Pedro Pizarro describes a gate flanked by walls as the only way through the terraces. Protzen thinks that these descriptions allude to a set of eleven terraces that close the plain of Mascabamba, near Ollantaytambo, which include the heavily fortified gate of T'iyupunku. At this location, when the Spaniards faced the terraces they would have had the Urubamba River to their left and the steep hill of Cerro Pinkuylluna to their right, matching the three sides from which they were attacked during the battle. If Protzen's hypothesis is correct, the river diverted to flood the battlefield was the Urubamba, and not its smaller affluent, the Patakancha, which runs alongside the town of Ollantaytambo.

== Aftermath ==
The success at Ollantaytambo encouraged Manco Inca to make a renewed attempt against Cusco. However, the Spaniards discovered the Inca army concentrating near the city and mounted a night attack, which inflicted heavy casualties. On April 18, 1537, a Spanish army led by Diego de Almagro returned from a long expedition to Chile and occupied Cusco. Almagro imprisoned Hernando Pizarro and his brother Gonzalo because he wanted the city for himself; most Spanish troops and their auxiliaries joined his side. He had previously tried to negotiate a settlement with Manco Inca but his efforts failed when both armies clashed at Calca, near Cusco. With the Spaniards' position consolidated by Almagro's reinforcements, Manco Inca decided that Ollantaytambo was too close to Cusco to be tenable so he withdrew further west to the town of Vitcos. Almagro sent his lieutenant Rodrigo Orgóñez in pursuit with 300 Spaniards and numerous Indian auxiliaries. In July 1537, Orgoñez occupied and sacked Vitcos, taking many prisoners, but Manco managed to escape. He took refuge at Vilcabamba, a remote location where the Neo-Inca State was established and lasted until the capture and execution of Túpac Amaru, its last emperor, in 1572.

== See also ==
- List of battles won by Indigenous peoples of the Americas
- Encomienda
- History of Peru
- Inter caetera
- Spanish colonization of the Americas
