= Dzikowski =

Dzikowski (feminine: Dzikowska) is a Polish surname. Notable people with the surname include:

- Elżbieta Dzikowska (born 1937), Polish art historian, sinologist, explorer, director, and writer
- Waldy Dzikowski (born 1959), Polish politician
