= Francisco de Toledo =

Viceroy of Peru (1515–1582)

The Most Excellent Don Francisco Álvarez de Toledo
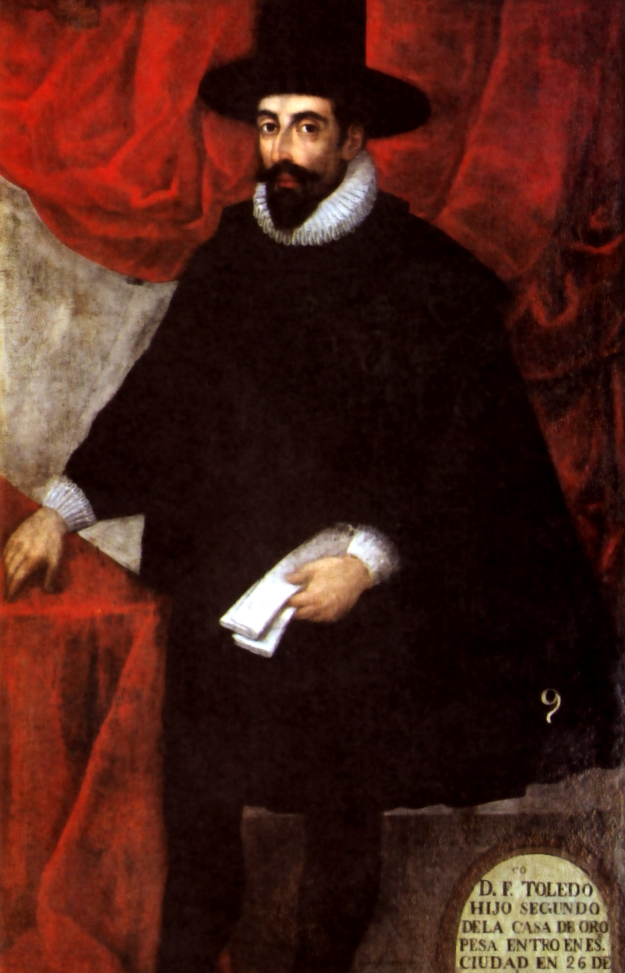

5th Viceroy of Peru
- In office November 30, 1569 – May 1, 1581
- Monarch: Philip II of Spain
- Preceded by: Lope García de Castro
- Succeeded by: Martín Enríquez de Almanza

Personal details
- Born: 10 July 1515 Oropesa, Crown of Castile
- Died: 21 April 1582 (aged 66) Escalona, Crown of Castile
- Profession: politician and soldier

Military service
- Battles/wars: Conquest of Tunis; Conquest of Peru

Francisco Álvarez de Toledo (Oropesa, 10 July 1515 – Escalona, 21 April 1582), also known as The Viceroyal Solon, was a Spanish aristocrat and soldier of the Kingdom of Spain and the Spanish Empire’s fifth Viceroy of Peru. Often regarded as the "most important of Peru's viceroys", his administration is notable for its devastating impact on the American Indians of Peru.

Toledo brought stability to a tumultuous viceroyalty of Spain and enacted administrative policies which changed the character of Spanish colonial rule and the relationship between the American Indians of the Andes and their Spanish colonial overlords. Leading a policy of "reductions", Toledo forcibly relocated about 1.4 million American Indians of Peru and Bolivia into new settlements in order to enforce their Christianization, collect tributes and taxes, and gather American Indian labor to work in mines and other Spanish enterprises. This policy increased the demands on forced labor compared to that of mit'a in the Inca Empire. He also executed Túpac Amaru, the last Inca chief of the Neo-Inca State in Vilcabamba.

Toledo held the position of viceroy from November 30, 1569, until 1 May 1581, a total of eleven years and five months. He has been praised as the "supreme organizer" of the immense viceroyalty, giving it a legal structure and strengthening institutions by which the Spanish colony functioned for more than two hundred years. Scholar John Hemming described Toledo as "one of the world's great colonial administrators". He also described him as "honest and honorable but cold and unfeeling...autocratic" and "with the temperament of an ascetic."

== Birth and early years ==
Francisco Álvarez de Toledo was born on 15 July 1515 in Oropesa, Castile belonging to the noble family Álvarez de Toledo. He was the fourth and last child of Francisco Álvarez de Toledo y Pacheco, II Count of Oropesa, and María Figueroa y Toledo, eldest daughter of Gómez Suárez de Figueroa, II Count of Feria and María Álvarez de Toledo, daughter of the I Duke of Alba de Tormes. The death of his mother is speculated to have made him serious and taciturn. His mother's aunts, Mary and Elizabeth, were responsible for his upbringing.

At the age of eight he moved to the court of King Charles I of Spain, to serve as a page to the queen consorts Leonor and Isabel. He learned Latin, history, rhetoric and theology, fencing, music, dancing and courtly manners.

== Serving the Emperor Charles V ==
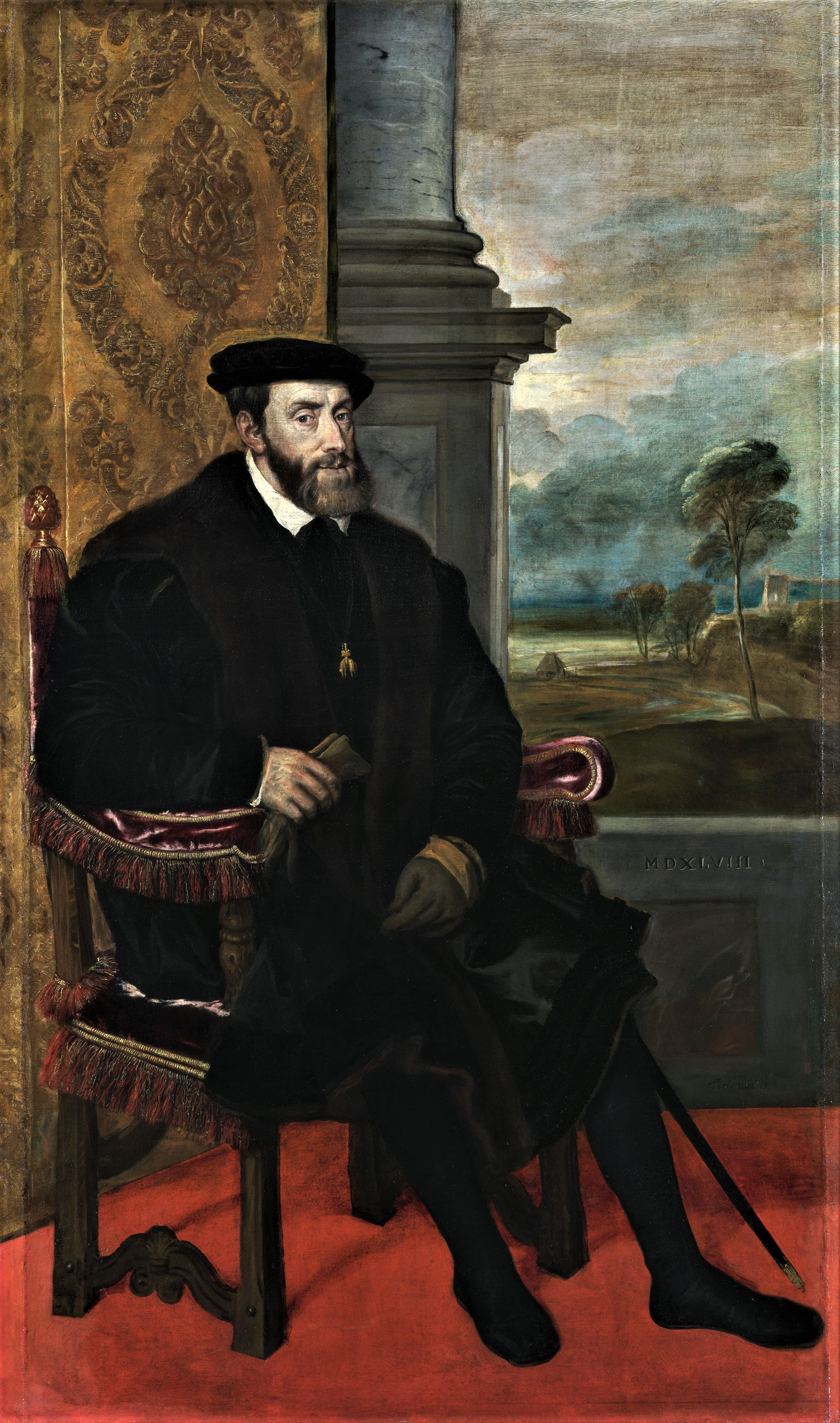
The King Charles I of Spain also known as the Emperor Charles V of the Holy Roman Empire

Toledo entered the service of King Charles I (also called the Emperor Charles V), in 1530, at the age of fifteen. The king's Machiavelliananism approach and tendency to seek balance between his collaborators, would influence Toledo's future governmental work.

In 1535, when he was twenty, he was invested with the habit of a knight of the Order of Alcántara, a religious-military order. In 1551, he was given the command of Acebuchar by the Order.

His first military engagement was during the Conquest of Tunis (1535) in which imperial troops removed the Ottoman Turks from their outpost in North Africa. He also participated in the Italian War of 1536-1538 against France, which was triggered by Charles I defying Francis I by installing his son as regent of the Duchy of Milan. Following the signing of peace, Toledo returned to Spain and later went to Ghent, in Flanders. In 1541, he participated in the expedition to the Ottoman Algiers, a campaign which ended in failure due to bad weather. In the following years, he served on the diets, boards and councils, and participated in Spanish negotiations with England to start a new war against France.

He engaged with the issue of the legal status of Native Americans in Hispanic America by participating in the debate between Juan Ginés Sepúlveda and Bartolomé de las Casas in Valladolid, and was familiar with the New Laws of the Indies, issued by Charles I, which caused a stir in Peru.

He left Barcelona for Italy and Germany with the emperor during the fourth war against France in 1543. He participated in the battles of Gelderland and Düren.

In 1556, when Charles I abdicated, he accompanied him on his trip to the Monastery of Yuste in Spain. On November 12, they entered the castle in Jarandilla de la Vera, where they were hosted by Fernando Álvarez de Toledo y Figueroa, 4th Count of Oropesa. The stay lasted until February 3, 1557, when the preparations in Yuste were finished. Álvarez de Toledo stayed with Charles I at Yuste until his death in 1558.

The following years were spent by Álvarez de Toledo in activities related to the Order of Alcántara. Between 1558 and 1565 he remained in Rome, where he participated in the discussion and definition of the statutes of the Order, as attorney general.

== Viceroy of Peru ==
Toledo became the fifth Viceroy of Peru (which included at the time Bolivia) in 1569. He was appointed viceroy by Philip II of Spain. Peru was the "jewel" of Spain's colonial empire. The conquest of the Inca Empire by Francisco Pizarro in 1532-1533 had given Spain enormous wealth, but Toledo inherited a chaotic situation. The problems facing Toledo included conflicts between the Spanish conquistadors and the secular and religious authorities in Peru. Corruption by colonial officials was endemic. The Peruvian population of indigenous people, Andeans, had declined by about 75 percent (from 10 million to 2.5 million) from 1520 to 1570 due to conflicts and epidemics of European diseases. A rump state of the Inca Empire still existed outside Spanish control in Vilcabamba. Most seriously, from the viewpoint of Spain, the production of silver, a major contributor to Spain's finances, was declining.

Until the arrival of Álvarez de Toledo as Viceroy, Spanish rule of the Andean population had largely been indirect. Except for Roman Catholic priests, Spaniards were forbidden from living among the Indians and the Spanish extracted tribute and labor from the Andean population through their indigenous leaders, the caciques or kurakas. Other than the often brutal demands of the Spanish colonists for labor and tribute, the Andean Indian culture remained largely unchanged from the days when the Incas ruled.

Toledo conceived and implemented an ambitious program to "put down neo-Inca insurrection, strengthen colonial government and legal institutions, indoctrinate the native populace in Catholicism, and shore up faltering revenue streams from mining".

=== General Inspection (Visita General) ===
Following the recommendations of the king, Álvarez de Toledo set out to visit the territories under his charge—a task never previously attempted due to the vast extent of the Viceroyalty of Peru and one that would undoubtedly prove arduous. This undertaking aimed to reshape the economy, territory, and Andean society within the Kingdoms of Peru and established the following objectives:

• Develop a new tax rate ledger.

• Strengthen the administration of justice to protect indigenous people.

• Gather indigenous populations into settlement towns.

Fulfilling his duties, he left Lima on October 22, 1570, accompanied by his secretary Álvaro Ruiz de Navamuel and other knowledgeable men, including cosmographer and historian Pedro Sarmiento de Gamboa and naturalist Tomás Vásquez. Later joined by Juan Polo de Ondegardo, Juan de Matienzo, and the religious chronicler José de Acosta, these companions were general visitors who received orders and instructions aligned with these objectives and were empowered politically to intervene in judicial matters within regional locales to restore social peace following the turmoil of recent wars.

These officials were tasked with curbing excesses in tribute rates (which powerful encomenderos, indigenous chiefs, and other figures collected illegally) and resolving disputes over land rights and cases of abuse against commoners and indigenous people, mediating or arbitrating where necessary. More specifically, they were instructed to act against anyone who mistreated or wronged indigenous people:

"[…] in any way, to proceed against them, conducting the necessary investigations to uncover the truth, punishing the guilty, and adjudicating any indigenous lawsuits, whether newly initiated or pending before any courts."

Over the five-year inspection, Viceroy Álvarez de Toledo traveled an impressive 4,971 miles, which he divided into two stages. The first stage's route was Lima - Huarochirí - Jauja - Huamanga and Cusco. After two years in Cusco, he proceeded with the second stage, heading to Charcas Province along the route: Checacupe - Chucuito - Juli - La Paz - Potosí - La Plata. After an unfortunate expedition against the Chiriguanos in southeast Charcas, he returned to Lima via Arequipa and the sea.

The lengthy inspection had notable events. Entering the highlands through Huarochirí on November 20, 1570, he arrived in Jauja, where he established new indigenous towns and resettlements. Shocked by the numerous judicial records from local disputes, he demonstrated his pragmatism by burning all the files, considering them useless. He then constructed churches, rectified injustices, and worked to revive traditional Inca customs.

On December 15, he entered Huamanga (modern Ayacucho), where he attended to various projects, including focusing on the famous Huancavelica mercury mines. He ordered the construction of Villa Rica de Oropesa (modern Huancavelica) and the consolidation of indigenous settlements.

In Cusco from mid-February 1571 until October 5, 1572, he witnessed the grandeur of its architecture and population, aiming to restore Inca institutions and laws, recognizing their value and adapting them for governing indigenous people. He expanded settlements, distributed land ownership, planned the construction of churches, schools, and hospitals, and approved the creation of indigenous councils, allowing self-governance. He also addressed the situation of encomenderos (those collecting indigenous tribute), ensuring their duty to care for and instruct the indigenous people, provide education, and even cover service costs if needed.

Thus, the viceroyalty established a stable legal framework that would endure for over two centuries. From Cusco, Álvarez de Toledo managed, administered, and transformed the challenging conditions he encountered with dedication and patience, becoming the most impactful viceroy in Peruvian history.

As a result, the general visitors, who were experienced in law, mediated disputes over chieftaincies, imposed fines on encomenderos and chiefs found guilty of mistreating natives, and enforced legal obligations. They also sanctioned indigenous disobedience and resolved land disputes, reflecting the vast scope of social issues they addressed. Licentiates and professionals in judicial administration, including fiscal officers, judges, lawyers, and royal marshals, were often joined by armed men, such as captains and nobles, and local residents. In complex cases, they could redistribute land to concentrate indigenous people in settlements, with compensation requirements for affected individuals, primarily indigenous people with surplus land:

“[…] ensuring that relocated indigenous people would not lose or forfeit lands within a league of their new towns, allowing them to farm nearby land without hardship or leaving their homes. Otherwise, lands would be used to compensate Spaniards and natives who had land taken for these relocations.”

The main goal was to satisfy all parties, granting each group its due to balance Spanish interests in securing new possessions and indigenous interests in maintaining economic sustenance through traditional land use:

“[…] leaving the Spaniards content with secure estates and the Indians with funds for common needs, as they had enough land for their sustenance needs.” - Licentiate Juan de Matienzo, judge of Charcas.

However, a controversial decision during his rule was the capture of Túpac Amaru I, the fourth and last Inca of Vilcabamba. After the Incas breached the Treaty of Acobamba, Francisco de Toledo sent an army led by Martín Hurtado de Arbieto to Vilcabamba, where Túpac Amaru I was defeated and captured. The last Inca was publicly executed in September 1572 in Cusco's main square.

This action, among other decisions by Francisco Álvarez de Toledo, fostered strong animosity against him from certain officials, priests, and encomenderos discontented with the viceroy's reforms.

=== Destruction of the Neo-Inca State ===
When Toledo arrived in Peru in 1569, a Neo-Inca state with an emperor, Titu Cusi, still existed outside Spanish rule in the remote jungle city of Vilcabamba. Toledo initially hoped to lure Titu Cusi and other Inca nobles to Spanish authority by offering them estates and riches, but in the course of his investigations on the inspection tour, his opinion hardened. Toledo learned that the Inca Empire, and the emperor and his remnant state was still venerated by many Andeans and the Inca religion was still widely practiced. He perceived the Neo-Inca state as a threat to Spanish rule and embarked on a campaign to discredit the legitimacy of the former Inca Empire, the Neo-Inca state, and the Inca religion.

In May 1571, Titu Cusi died suddenly. The Incas in Vilcabamba blamed a Catholic priest for his death and killed him. Tupac Amaru became the new emperor. The Incas killed several more Spaniards and Toledo sent a military expedition of 250 Spaniards and 2,000 Andeans to Vilcabamba to destroy the Neo-Inca state. The Spanish captured Tupac Amaru and other Inca nobles and after a brief trial Tupac was beheaded in Plaza de Armas of Cuzco on 24 September 1572. Toledo then continued his campaign to wipe out the heritage of the Incas by destroying religious relics and punishing other Inca nobles. "Toledo rightly saw that the Inca myth would be an inspiration to any rebellious Indians over the coming centuries...but the mystique of the Incas was too strong to be rooted out by the determined Viceroy." The Incas had lost all power, but "the sentimental memory of the imperial past continued to flourish."

=== Reorganizing Peru ===
Toledo accomplished three major tasks in the reorganization of the Viceroyalty of Peru: (1) the mandatory resettlement of Andeans into Spanish-style villages called reductions; (2) the organization of silver and other mines to obtain greater revenue; and (3) the imposition of a country-wide system of forced labor by Andeans.

==== Reductions ====
Reductions were a feature of Spanish colonies throughout the Americas and in the Philippines. In Peru prior to Toledo's Viceroyalty, Andean Indians mostly lived in small, dispersed settlements. The scattered settlements made it difficult for Spanish colonial authorities to impose their rule, but the Andeans' livelihood and survival was often dependent upon their exploitation of several different environments at different elevations and characteristics, the so-called vertical archipelago. A primary motivation for Toledo's reductions "was to establish direct state control and facilitate the church's Christianization of the native population, while enhancing the collection of the tribute tax and the allocation of labor." Toledo said the reductions would protect natives from "being exploited by local landowners and miners, harassed by the colonial judicial system, and deceived by a false religion." Spanish authorities perceived indigenous groups as volatile and prone to lawlessness and laziness if not controlled. Toledo's most important justification of the reductions was, as he told the king of Spain, that they would be located near the mines that were so important to Spanish finances.

Toledo's plans envisioned 840 reductions with a total population of about 1.4 million Andeans, an average of about 1,600 people per reduction. Each reduction resembled a Spanish town with a main plaza and square and a regular grid of streets. Even the design of the houses in the reduction was dictated. They were, for example, to be open to the street to "minimize the danger that too much privacy would lead to idolatry, drunkenness, and illicit sexual intercourse." A priest attended to the spiritual needs of the residents. The leadership of each reduction was the responsibility of a Spanish style government, but the most important official of the reduction was a kuraka, an indigenous leader who had the responsibility of collecting tribute and laborers for mining and other enterprises.

Toledo's reductions have been characterized as both mostly successful and as failures. Many towns in Peru and Bolivia trace their foundation to the creation of a reduction. However, concentrating the Andean population into reductions increased the incidence of disease and the population of the old Inca Empire continued to decline for at least another 50 years after Toledo. A report to the king of Spain in the 1580s said that "many of the Indians have died in the mines, in other labors, or from the recurrent epidemics; others have fled to escape their labor and tribute obligations."

==== Mining ====
Mining, especially silver mining, was the most important economic enterprise of the Viceroyalty. A single mountain at Potosí in Bolivia produced an estimated 60% of all the silver mined in the world during the second half of the 16th century. A twenty percent tax on mining was a major source of revenue for the kingdom of Spain.

Silver was mined at Potosí by Inca methods, but the purest silver was depleted by the 1560s and production declined. However, the Patio process, a new method of purifying silver ore using mercury, was invented in Mexico. Toledo confiscated the mercury mines at Huancavelica for the Spanish crown and introduced the Patio process. He called it "the most important marriage in the world between the mountain of Huancavelica and the mountain of Potosi." Between 1571 and 1575 production of silver quintupled. The increase in silver and mercury production resulted in a demand for thousands of laborers with much of the demand being filled by forced laborers. Potosí became one of the largest cities of the world with a population as large as London.

==== Forced labor ====
The most important objective of Toledo's reductions was to facilitate access to Andean labor, especially for the mines whose revenues were important to the finances of the mother country of Spain.

==== Other measures ====
Toledo assigned Pedro Sarmiento de Gamboa the task of writing a chronicle of prehispanic times in Peru by compiling information given by some of the older survivors from that time. Sarmiento's work is considered an invaluable source of information for that period. Toledo sent the account to the King, in hopes that a museum would be founded.

He established the Inquisition in Peru in 1570. Jerónimo Luis de Cabrera founded the city of Córdoba (in modern-day Argentina) on July 6, 1573. Tarija and Cochabamba (both in modern Bolivia) were founded in 1574.

In 1574, Toledo accompanied a military expedition to the Chaco region in what is now southeastern Bolivia to repress the Eastern Bolivian Guaraní people who the Inca and Spanish called Chiriguanos (a pejorative name). The Guaraní were raiding Spanish and Indian settlements in the Andes. The expedition was a failure and Toledo nearly died of an illness, probably malaria.

In 1579 Francis Drake was ravaging the coast of Peru. Toledo sent a fleet of ships after the Englishman but failed to capture Drake and his galleon the Golden Hind who then went on to capture the treasure galleon Nuestra Señora de la Concepción. Afterwards Toledo subsequently built fortifications on the coast for protection against pirates and also established la Armada del Mar del Sur (the Southern Fleet) under Pedro Sarmiento de Gamboa in the port of El Callao.

He built bridges and improved the safety of travel in the viceroyalty. The first coins minted for Peru (and indeed for South America) appeared between 1568 and 1570. The silver from mines at Potosí circulated around the world.

== Recall, return to Spain, imprisonment and death ==
In spite of this, Toledo was blamed for the viceregal books not being balanced and taxes not being sent back to Spain. He was recalled to Spain in 1581. There he was jailed until 1582, where he died of natural causes.

== See also ==
- Neo-Inca State
- Spanish conquest of the Inca Empire

Government offices
Preceded by Lope García de Castro	Viceroy of Peru; 1569–1581	Succeeded by Martín Enríquez de Almanza
