= Diego Ortiz (disambiguation) =

Diego Ortiz (c. 1510 – c. 1576) was a Spanish composer and music theorist.

Diego Ortiz may also refer to:

- Diego Ortiz de Calzadilla (died 1519), Castilian bishop, theologian and astronomer in Portuguese service
- Diego Ruiz Ortiz (1532–1571), Spanish friar and missionary in Peru, regarded as a martyr
- Diego Ortiz de Zárate y Mendieta, Spanish conquistador and governor of the Río de la Plata (1576–1577)
- Diego Ortiz de Zúñiga (died 1680), Spanish historian
- Diego Ortiz Parrilla (died 1775), Spanish soldier, politician, explorer and cartographer
