= Pepper and vanilla =

Polish television program

Pieprz i wanilia (en. Pepper and Vanilla) was a popular TV program broadcast by TVP, created and presented by Tony Halik and Elżbieta Dzikowska. The program was broadcast for over twenty years and had over 300 episodes. It is the longest lasting documental program in TVP. The movies were filmed mainly for American televisions.

The program always started with a recording from visited places with the comments of the presenters. After that there was a conversation between them, showing the artefacts brought from the journeys and answering the letters.

The program was extremely popular because of the two presenters, who are great travellers, but mainly because during the PRL people couldn't travel themselves. The opportunity for travelling was closed for people by government, passport weren't issued, therefore the program was the only way to see the world back then.

Tony Halik died in 1998. Most of the things presented in the program and brought from various journeys were given to National Ethnographic Museum and to Toruń, where Travellers Museum was created.
