= Oropesa, Spain =

Oropesa
- Municipality
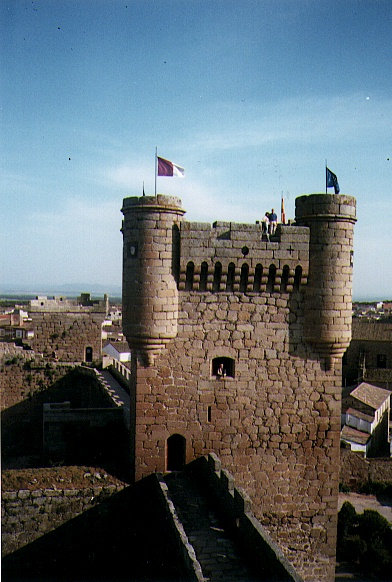

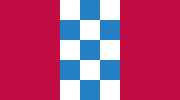
- Flag Coat of arms

- Location in Spain
- Coordinates: 39°55′N 5°11′W
- Country: Spain
- Autonomous community: Castile-La Mancha
- Province: Toledo
- Comarca: Campana de Oropesa
- Judicial district: Talavera de la Reina

Government
  - Alcalde: Juan Antonio Morcillo Reviriego (2007)

Area
  - Total: 337 km^{2} (130 sq mi)
- Elevation: 425 m (1,394 ft)

Population (2025-01-01)
  - Total: 2,587
  - Density: 7.68/km^{2} (19.9/sq mi)
- Demonym(s): Oropesano, na
- Time zone: UTC+1 (CET)
  - Summer (DST): UTC+2 (CEST)
- Postal code: 45560
- Dialing code: 925
- Official language(s): Castilian
- Website: Official website

Oropesa (Spanish: [oɾoˈpesa]) is a Spanish town in the province of Toledo. The town of 2,872 is famous for its castle, which was built in 1402, turned into a Parador Nacional — the Parador de Oropesa — in 1930. The castle was formerly the residence of the Toledo family of nobles. This includes Francisco de Toledo, Count of Oropesa, who became the Viceroy of Peru.

The town has a yearly celebration in April called "Jornadas Medievales", or "Medieval Days", which plays off the presence of the Castle in Oropesa.

== Etymology ==
The place name Oropesa is of very ancient origin and much-debated etymology. The most widely-accepted theory is that it derives from the pre-Roman place name Otobesa.

== Sources ==
- García Sánchez, Jairo Javier (1998). Toponimia mayor de la Tierra de Talavera. Excmo. Ayuntamiento de Talavera de la Reina. ISBN 84-88439-70-9.

== See also ==
- Municipal Website (in Spanish)
