= Diego Ruiz Ortiz =

Castilian Augustinian friar and missionary to the Viceroyalty of Peru

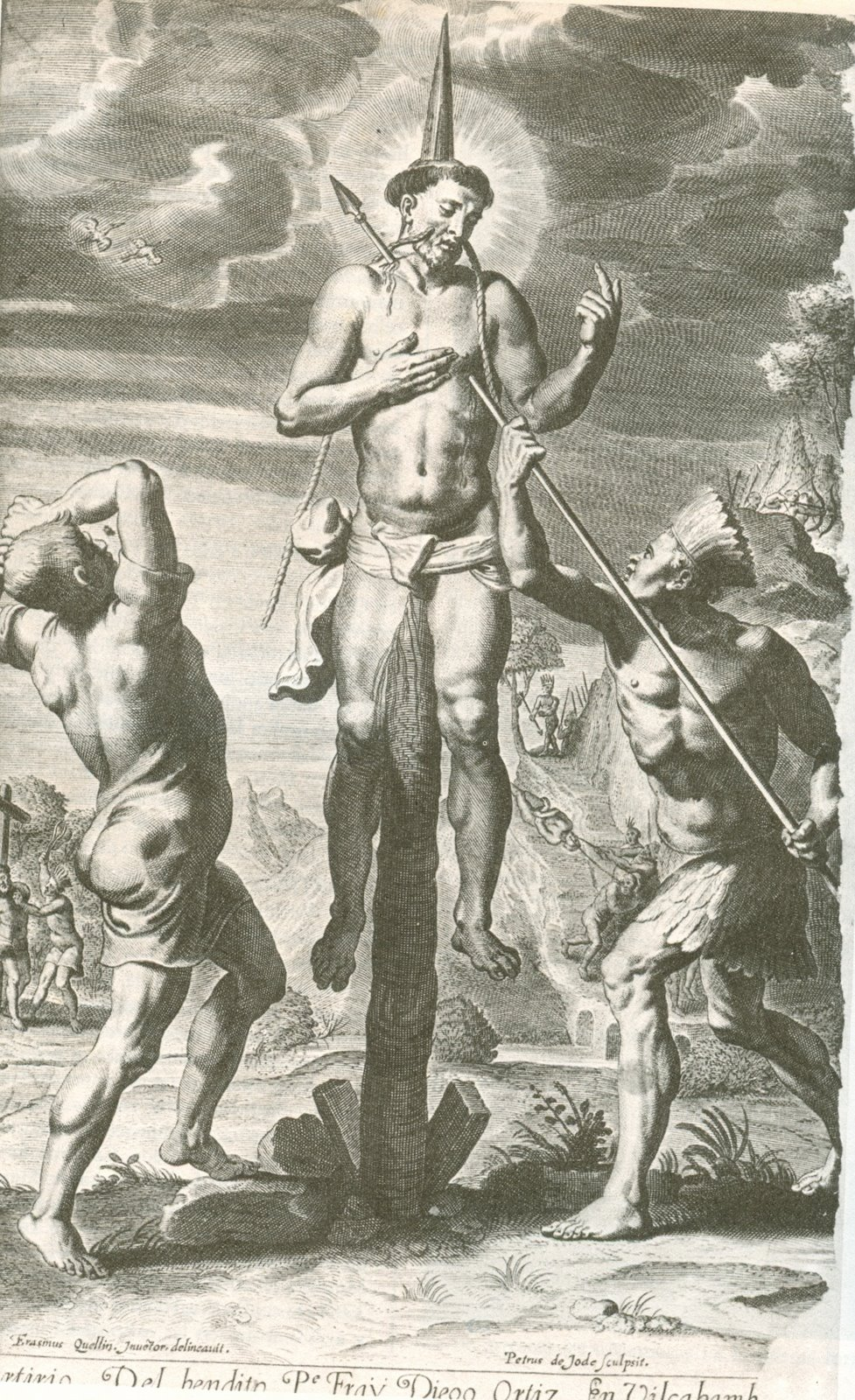
Martyrdom of Ortiz, engraving by Pieter de Jode II

Diego Ruiz Ortiz (24 July 1532 – 1571) was a Castilian Augustinian friar and missionary to the Viceroyalty of Peru. He is regarded as the first Christian martyr of Peru.

Ortiz was born in Getafe and orphaned by the age of twelve, when he moved to Seville. He joined the Augustinian order at the age of fifteen. He arrived in Peru as a missionary in 1548. He learned Quechua and Aymara and evangelized in Puná. In 1563, he was appointed curate of Yanacache and later superior or sacristan of the convent in Cuzco. In 1566, he was sent as a priest to Capinota.

In 1569, Ortiz was sent to join Marcos García in Vilcabamba, the capital of the Neo-Inca State. With royal permission, he established a hospital and school in Vilcabamba. García was exiled in 1570. In 1571, the Inca ruler, Titu Cusi, contracted dysentery. Ortiz tried unsuccessfully to treat him. When Titu Cusi died, his widow, Angelina Polanquilaco, ordered Ortiz arrested. The military captains tortured and executed Ortiz. In 1572, the Spanish conquered Vilcabamba and learned of the friar's death.

The main source for Ortiz's death is the Coronica Moralizada de la Orden de San Agustin en el Peru by Antonio de la Calancha (1638).

== Sources ==
- Benito Rodríguez, José Antonio (2018). "Ruiz Ortiz, Diego". Diccionario Biográfico Español. Real Academia de la Historia.
- Redden, Andrew, ed. (2016). The Collapse of Time: The Martyrdom of Diego Ortiz (1571) by Antonio de la Calancha [1638]. Berlin: De Gruyter Open. doi:10.1515/9783110468298. ISBN 978-3-11-046829-8.
