= Tony Halik =

Polish writer (1921–1998)

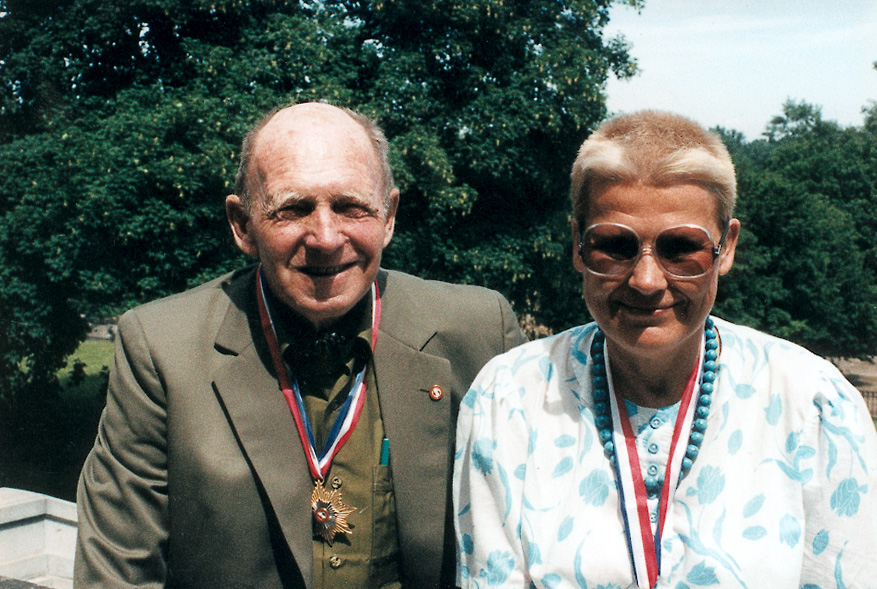
Tony Halik and Elżbieta Dzikowska

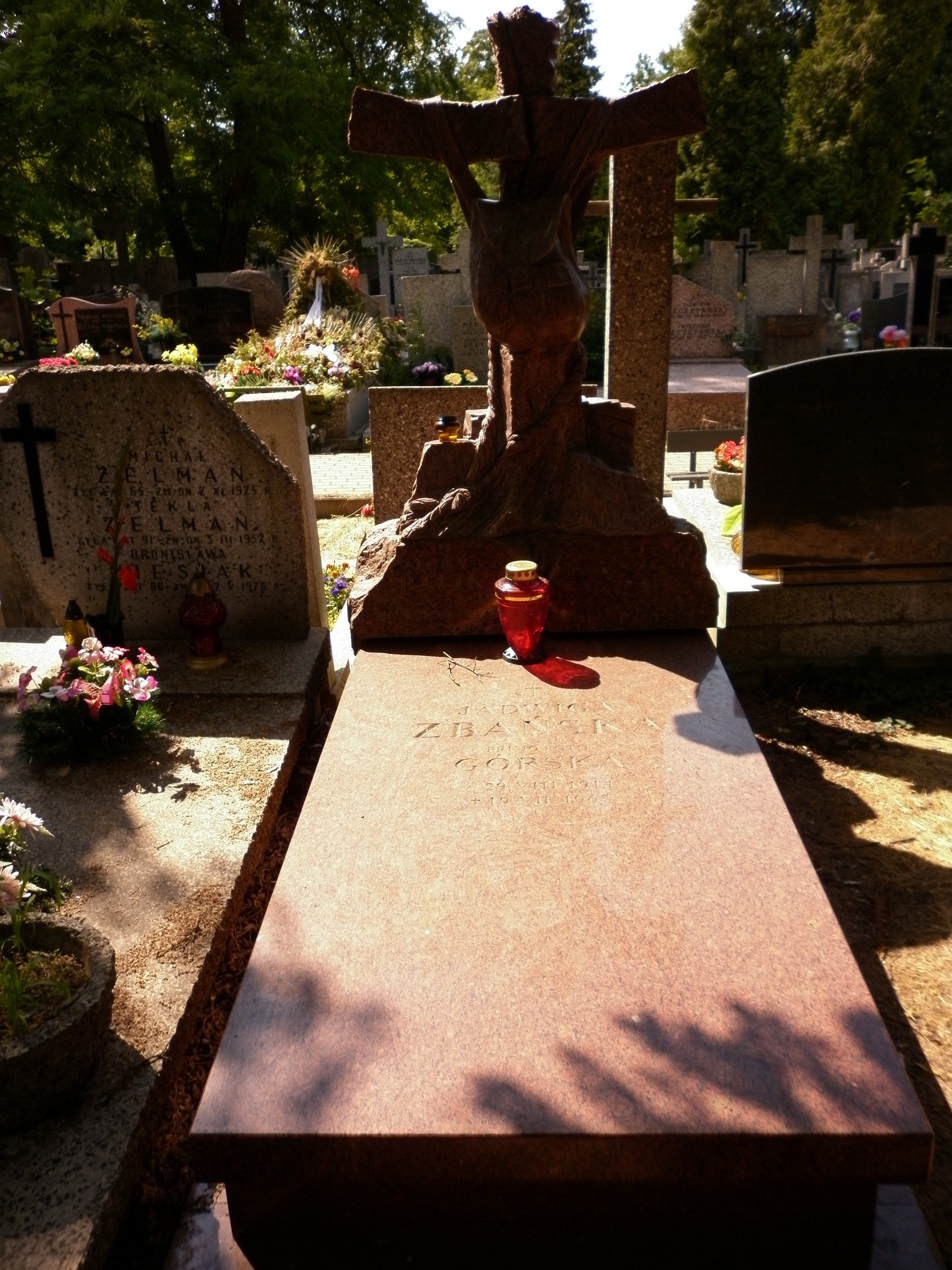
Tony Halik's grave, Bródno Cemetery in Warsaw

Tony Halik, born Mieczysław Antoni Sędzimir Halik (January 24, 1921 – May 23, 1998) was a Polish film operator, documentary film-maker, author of travel books, traveller, explorer, and polyglot (speaking Spanish, English, French, Portuguese, Italian, German, Guarani and Xavante).

Halik was born in Toruń, Poland.

During World War II, as a Polish citizen under German occupation he was forcibly drafted into the Kampfgeschwader 40, a Luftwaffe squadron, and served in France, where in 1944 he deserted and joined the French Resistance. For his actions, he was awarded the French Croix de guerre.

After the war, he married Pierrette Andrée Courtin in 1946 and in 1948 they settled down in Argentina. Soon afterwards he started working as a photojournalist, film operator, and correspondent for various Argentinian media. Since 1956 he worked as a correspondent for Life and NBC.

In 1974 Halik met Elżbieta Dzikowska, his later life partner. Around this date he moved back to Poland.

In 1976, along with Elżbieta Dzikowska and Prof. Edmundo Guillén, he reached the legendary Inca capital Vilcabamba.

For over twenty years, Halik and Dzikowska hosted over three hundred TV shows and series for Polish Television. He also created over four hundred documentary films, wrote thirteen books and many press articles.

He died in Warsaw, Poland.

== See also ==
- District Museum in Toruń

== Bibliography ==
- https://culture.pl/en/article/180000-kilometres-of-adventure-one-polish-cameramans-hunt-for-the-perfect-shot - Tony Halik short biography - article based on biography by Mirosław Wlazły
- Tu byłem. Tony Halik ('been here. Tony Halik') - detailed biography by Mirosław Wlekły, Agora 2017, in Polish
- 200 días de Mato Grosso : relato de las aventuras en las selvas de Brasil. by Antonio Halik, in Spanish
- Con cámara y rifle a través del Mato Grosso; aventuras en las selvas amazónicas. by Antonio Halik, in Spanish
- 180.000 kilómetros de aventuras relato vívido y apasionante de un viaje a través de las tres Américas. by Antonio Halik, in Spanish
