= Túpac Amaru =

Monarch of the Inca state in Peru

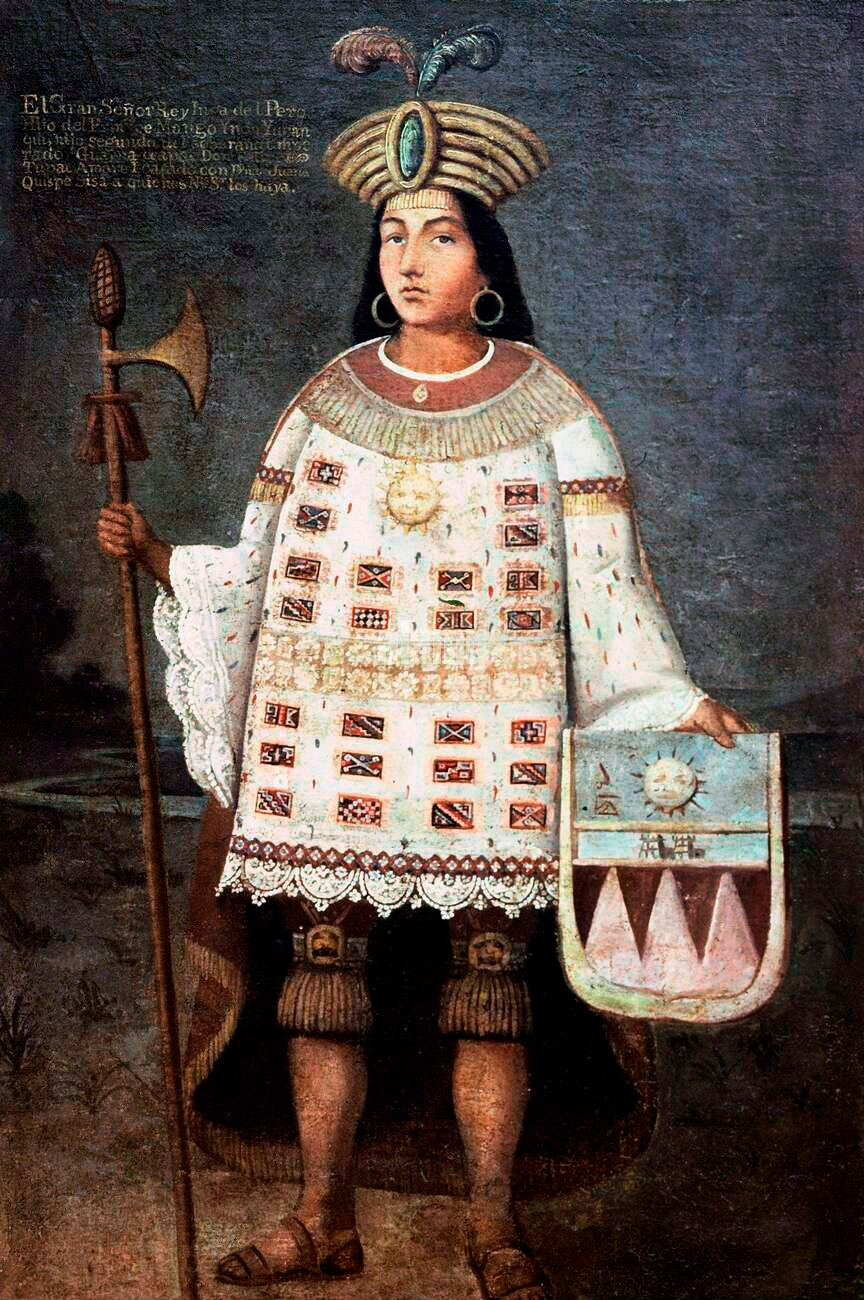
- Túpac Amaru, the last Sapa Inca of Vilcabamba

Sapa Inca of the Neo-Inca State
- Reign: 1571–1572
- Predecessor: Titu Cusi
- Successor: State abolished Juan Santos Atahualpa [as self-proclaimed Sapa Inca of a (neo-)Inca Empire]
- Born: 14 April 1545; Peru
- Died: 24 September 1572 (aged 27); Cusco, Viceroyalty of Peru, modern-day Peru
- Quechua: Tupaq Amaru
- Dynasty: Hanan Qusqu
- Father: Manco Inca Yupanqui

Túpac Amaru or Thupa Amaru (14 April 1545 – 24 September 1572) (first name also spelled Túpac, Tupac, Topa, Tupaq, Thupaq, Thupa, last name also spelled Amaro instead of Amaru) was the last Sapa Inca of the Neo-Inca State, the final remaining independent part of the Inca Empire. He was executed by the Spanish following a months-long pursuit after the fall of the Neo-Inca State.

His name is derived from the Quechua words thupaq, meaning "royal" or "shining" and amaru, which can either mean "snake" or refer to the snake-like being from Andean mythology.

== Accession ==
Following the Spanish conquest of Peru in the 1530s, a few members of the royal family established the small independent Neo-Inca State in Vilcabamba, which was located in the relatively inaccessible Upper Amazon to the northeast of Cusco. The founder of this state was Manco Inca Yupanqui (also known as Manco Cápac II), who had initially allied himself with the Spanish, then led an unsuccessful war against them before establishing himself in Vilcabamba in 1540. After a Spanish attack in 1544 in which Manco Inca Yupanqui was killed, his son Sayri Túpac assumed the title of Sapa Inca (emperor, literally "only Inca"), before accepting Spanish authority in 1558, moving to Cuzco and dying (perhaps by poison) in 1561. He was succeeded in Vilcabamba by his brother Titu Cusi, who himself died in 1571. Túpac Amaru, another brother of the two preceding emperors, then succeeded to the title in Vilcabamba.

== Final war with and capture by Spanish ==
At this time, the Spanish were still unaware of the death of the previous Sapa Inca (Titu Cusi) and had routinely sent two ambassadors to continue ongoing negotiations being held with Titu Cusi. They were both killed on the border by an Inca captain.

Using the justification that the Incas had "broken the inviolate law observed by all nations of the world regarding ambassadors", the new viceroy, Francisco de Toledo, Count of Oropesa, decided to attack and conquer Vilcabamba. He declared war on 14 April 1572. The first engagement of the war commenced in the Vilcabamba valley on 1 June. The Inca people attacked first with much spirit despite being only lightly armed. Again and again, they attempted to lift the siege held by the Spanish and their native allies but each time they were forced to retreat. On 24 June the Spanish entered Vilcabamba to find it deserted and the Sapa Inca gone. The city had been entirely destroyed and the last remnants of the Inca Empire, the Neo-Inca State now officially ceased to exist.

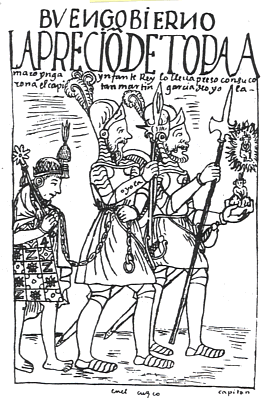
Tupaq Amaru, last Inca King, prisoner of the Spaniards, 1572 (drawing by Guaman Poma de Ayala)

Túpac Amaru had left the previous day with a party of about 100 and headed west into the lowland forests. The group, which included his generals and family members, had then split up into smaller parties in an attempt to avoid capture.

Three groups of Spanish soldiers pursued them. One group captured Titu Cusi's son and wife. A second returned with military prisoners along with gold, silver and other precious jewels. The third group returned with Túpac Amaru's two brothers, other relatives and several of his generals. The Sapa Inca and his commander remained at large.

Following this, a group of forty hand-picked soldiers under Martín García Óñez de Loyola set out to pursue them. They followed the Masahuay river for 170 miles, where they found an Inca warehouse with quantities of gold and the Inca's tableware. The Spanish captured a group of Chunco and compelled them to tell them what they had seen and if they had seen the Sapa Inca. They reported that he had gone down river, by boat, to a place called Momorí. The Spaniards then constructed five rafts and pursued them.

At Momorí, they discovered that Tupac Amaru had escaped by land. They followed with the help of the Manarí, who advised which path the Inca had followed and reported that Túpac was slowed by his wife, who was about to give birth. After a fifty-mile march, they saw a campfire around nine o'clock at night. They found the Sapa Inca Túpac Amaru and his wife warming themselves. They assured them that no harm would come to them and secured their surrender. Túpac Amaru was arrested.

The captives were brought back to the ruins of Vilcabamba and together they were all marched into Cuzco on 21 September. The invaders also brought the mummified remains of Manco Cápac and Titu Cusi and a gold statue of Punchao, a representation of the Inca's lineage containing the mortal remains of the hearts of the deceased Inca kings. These sacred items were then destroyed.

== Execution ==
The five captured Inca generals received a summary trial and were sentenced to death by hanging. Several had already died of torture or disease.

The trial of the Sapa Inca himself began a couple of days later. Túpac Amaru was convicted of the murder of the priests in Vilcabamba and sentenced to be beheaded. It was reported in various sources in 1598 that numerous Catholic clerics, convinced of Túpac Amaru's innocence, pleaded to no avail, on their knees, that the Inca be sent to Spain for a trial instead of being executed.

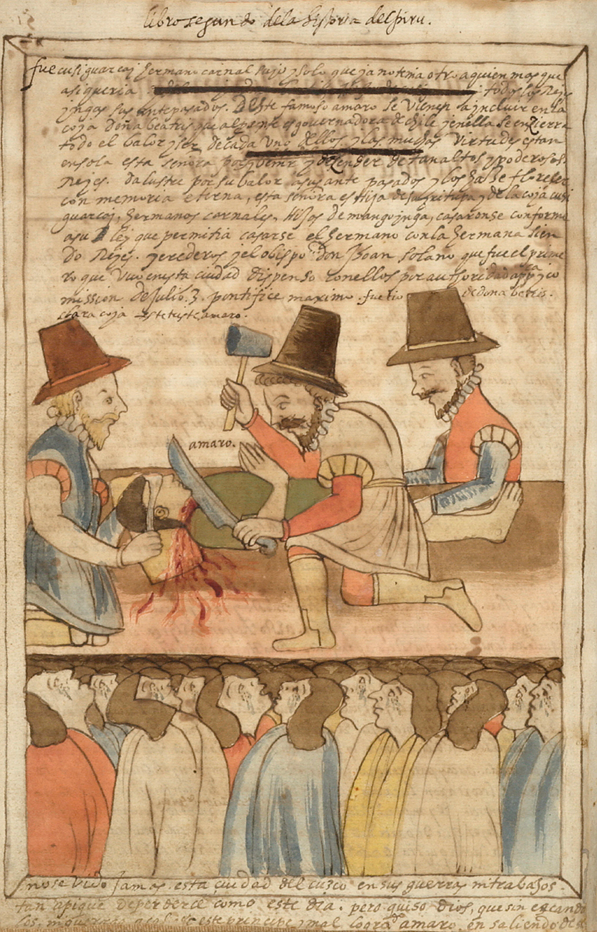
Drawing by the chronicler Martín de Murúa showing the execution of Túpac Amaru I, with his executioner being a Spaniard.

Many have argued that Viceroy Toledo, in executing a head of state recognized by the Spanish as an independent king, exceeded his authority and, by Spanish legal standards, committed a crime. Other claims have been made to the contrary – that Túpac Amaru was in rebellion (his predecessors having allegedly accepted Spanish authority), that Toledo had tried peaceful means to settle differences, that three of his ambassadors to the Inca were murdered and that Túpac Amaru subsequently raised an army to resist the colonial army. The King of Spain, Philip II, disapproved of the execution.

An eyewitness report from the day recalls Túpac Amaru riding a mule with hands tied behind his back and a rope around his neck. Other witnesses reported there were great crowds and the Sapa Inca was surrounded by hundreds of guards with lances. In front of the Cathedral of Santo Domingo in the central square of Cuzco a black-draped scaffold had been erected. Reportedly 10,000 to 15,000 witnesses were present.

Túpac Amaru mounted the scaffold accompanied by the Bishop of Cuzco. As he did, it was reported by the same witnesses that a "multitude of Indians, who completely filled the square, saw that lamentable spectacle [and knew] that their lord and Inca was to die, they deafened the skies, making them reverberate with their cries and wailing."

As reported by eyewitnesses Baltasar de Ocampa and Friar Gabriel de Oviedo, Prior of the Dominicans at Cuzco, the Sapa Inca raised his hand to silence the crowds and his last words were: "Ccollanan Pachacamac ricuy auccacunac yawarniy hichascancuta." ("Pacha Kamaq, witness how my enemies shed my blood.")

== Descendants ==
Nearly forty years after the conquest of Peru began with the execution of Atahualpa, the conquest ended with the execution of his nephew. The Spanish Viceroy rounded up the royal descendants. Several dozen, including Túpac Amaru's three-year-old son, were banished to Mexico, Chile, Panama and elsewhere. Some of them were allowed to return home.

Túpac Amaru's memory lived on and would become personified in an important late eighteenth century insurgency that was rooted in aspirations toward a revival of Inca status vis-a-vis the Spanish administration. In 1780, José Gabriel Condorcanqui (Túpac Amaru II), who claimed to be a direct descendant of Túpac Amaru, led an indigenous uprising against continued Spanish presence in Peru alongside his wife Micaela Bastidas. Condorcanqui's rebellion emerged in response to new Bourbon Reforms implemented by the Spanish crown, which included incremental increases in levels of taxation upon indigenous populations – such as the alcabala or sales tax. Túpac Amaru II's rebellion was sparked when he (Condorcanqui) captured and killed the Spanish corregidor Antonio Arriaga in November 1780.

== Legacy ==
Historian El Inca Garcilaso De La Vega claimed that King Philip II disapproved of the public execution of Túpac Amaru. Túpac Amaru's death in 1572 has generated great interest centuries after.

Relatively little is known about Túpac Amaru, but this has not prevented his death from becoming a symbol of power to those in the region. Public figures such as Andean rebel leader Jose Gabriel Condorcanqui resonated with Túpac Amaru's ideology, so much so that he changed his name to Tupac Amaru II. Despite Túpac Amaru's short life and tragic death his legacy precedes him especially among the Peruvian community.

Primary school number 239 in Warsaw (Mirów), had been named in honor of Túpac Amaru, but it closed in 2001. Rapper Tupac Amaru Shakur was named after Túpac Amaru II.

== See also ==
- Amaru (mythology)
- Neo-Inca State
- Vilcabamba
- Manco Inca Yupanqui
- Sayri Tupac
- Túpac Amaru Revolutionary Movement

== Bibliography ==
- Beverley, John; "Túpac Amaru Rebellion", in Prem Poddar, et al., Historical Companion to Postcolonial Literatures — Continental Europe and its Colonies, Edinburgh University Press, 2008.
- Cobo, Bernabé, Historia del Nuevo Mundo, bk 12.
- Colección de documentos inéditos relativos al descubrimiento, conquista y organización de las antiquas posesiónes españoles de Ultramar, ed. Angel de Altolaguirre y Duvale and Adolfo Bonilla y San Martin, 25 vols., Madrid, 1885–1932, vol. 15, In Hemming.
- Flores-Ochoa, Jorge and Abraham Valencia E., Rebeliones indigenas, quechuas y aymaras - homenaje al bicentenario de la rebelion campesina de Thupa Amaro, 1780–1980, Cuzco, Peru, Centro de Estudios Andinos Cuzco, 1980.
- García de Castro, Lope, Despatch, Lima, 6 March 1565, Gobernantes del Perú, cartas y papeles, Siglo XVI, Documentos del Archivo de Indias, Coleción de Publicaciones Históricas de la Biblioteca del Congreso Argentino, ed. Roberto Levillier, 14 vols, Madrid, 1921–1926. In Hemming.
- Guillen Guillen, Edmundo, La Guerra de Reconquista Inca, Histórica épica de como Los Incas lucharon en Defensa de la Soberanía del Perú ó Tawantinsuyu entre 1536 y 1572, 1st ed., Lima.
- Hemming, John; The Conquest of the Incas, Harcourt, Brace, Jovanovich, New York, 1970.
- Lee, Vincent R., "Forgotten Vilcabamba, Final Stronghold of the Incas", Sixpac Manco, Colorado, 2000 ISBN 978-0-9677109-0-7.
- MacQuarrie, Kim; The Last Days of the Incas, Simon & Schuster, 2007, ISBN 978-0-7432-6049-7.
- Markham, Sir Clements; The Incas of Peru, 2nd ed., John Murray, London, 1912.
- Métraux, Alfred; The History of the Incas, tr. George Ordish, Pantheon Books, 1969.
- Murúa, Martín de, Historia General del Perú, Orígen y descendencia de los Incas (1590–1611), ed. Manuel Ballesteros-Gaibrois, 2 vols, Madrid, 1962, 1964. In Hemming.
- Ocampa, Baltasar de; Descripción de la Provincia de Sant Francisco de la Victoria de Villcapampa, [Vilcabampa], (1610), Tr. C. R. Markham, Hakluyt Society, Second Series, vol. 22, 1907. In Hemming.
- Salazar, Antonio Bautista de; Relación sobre el periodo del gobierno de los Virreyes Don Francisco de Toledo y Don García Hurtado de Mendoza (1596), Coleción de documentos inéditos relativos al descubrimiento, conquista y colonization de las posesiones espanolas en América y Oceanía sacadas en su mayor parte de Real Archivo de Indias, 42 vols, Madrid, 1864–1884. In Hemming.
- Titu Cusi Yupanqui, Inca Diego del Castro; Relación de la conquista del Perú y hechos del Inca Manco II; Instrución el muy Ille. Señor Ldo. Lope García de Castro, Gobernador que fue destos rreynos del Pirú (1570), Coleción de libros y documentos referentes a la historia del Perú, ed. Carlos A. Romero and Horacio H. Urteaga, two series, 22 vols, Lima, 1916–1935. In Hemming.
- Valladolid, 29 April 1549, Colección de documentos para la historia de la formación social de Hispano-América, ed. Richard Konetzke, 4 vols, Madrid, 1953, in Hemming.
- Vargas Ugarte, Ruben; Historia del Perú, Virreinato (1551–1600), Lima, 1949, p. 258.
- Walker, Charles F., The Tupac Amaru Rebellion, (Belknap Press, 2014).
- Walker, Charles F. and Liz Clarke; 2020, Witness to the Age of Revolution - The Odyssey of Juan Bautista Túpac Amaru, Oxford University Press.

Regnal titles
Preceded by Titu Cusi	Sapa Inca (as ruler of the Neo-Inca State); 1571–1572	State abolished
