= Titu Cusi =

Inca emperor

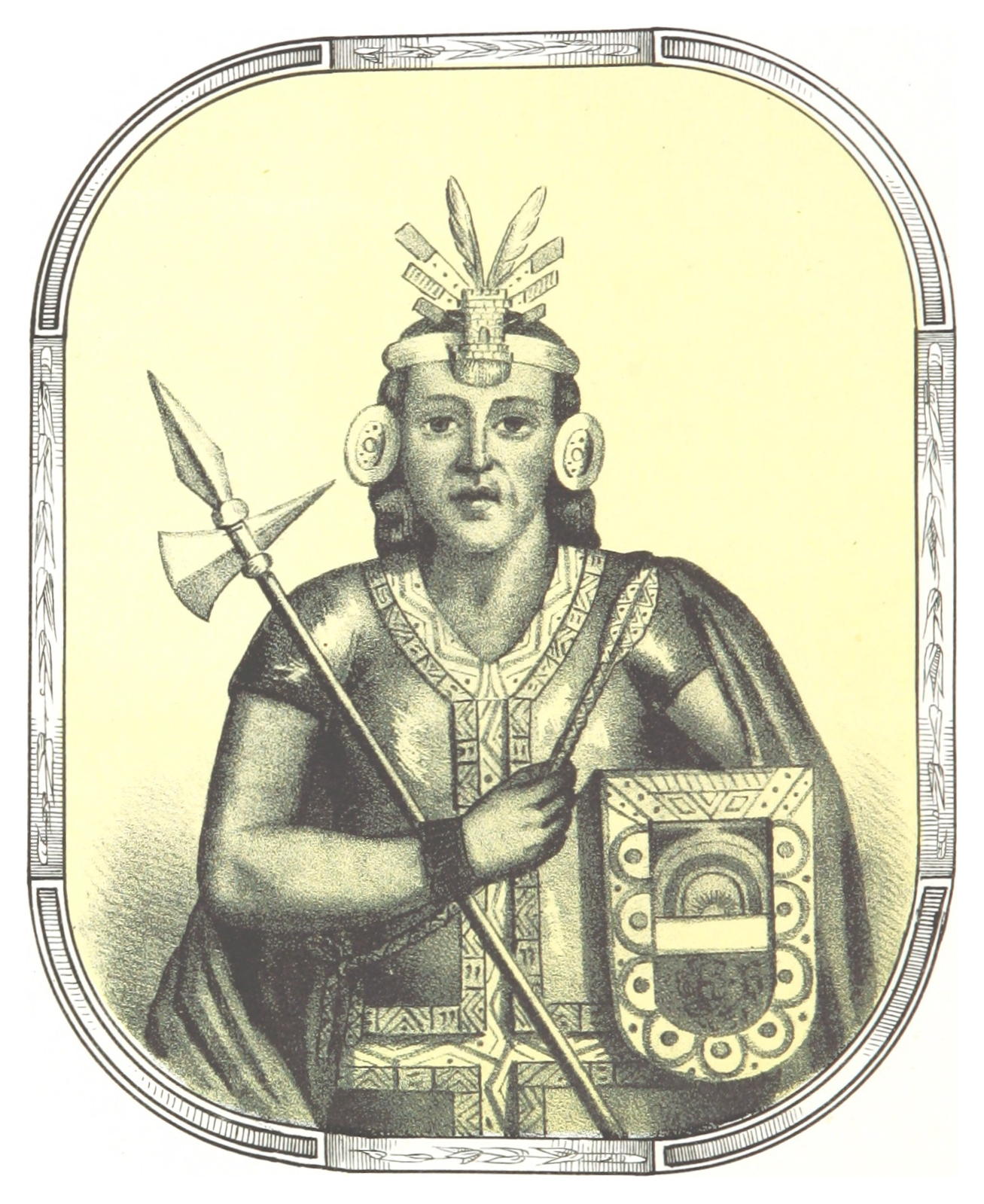

Sapa Inca of the Neo-Inca State
- Reign: 1560–1571
- Coronation: 1563
- Predecessor: Sayri Túpac
- Successor: Túpac Amaru
- Born: 1529; Cusco, Inca Empire
- Died: 1571 (aged 41–42); Vilcabamba, Neo-Inca State
- Dynasty: Hanan Qusqu
- Father: Manco Inca Yupanqui

Titu Cusi (Spanish: Diego de Castro Titu Kusi Yupanqui; Spanish pronunciation: [ˈdjeɣo ðe ˈkastɾo ˈtitu ˈkusi ʝuˈpaŋki]; Quechua: Titu Kusi Yupanki [ˈtɪtʊ ˈkʊsɪ jʊˈpæŋkɪ]) (1529 – 1571) was an Inca ruler of Vilcabamba and the penultimate leader of the Neo-Inca State. He was a son of Manco Inca Yupanqui. He was crowned in 1563, after the death of his half brother, Sayri Túpac. He ruled until his death in 1571, probably of pneumonia.

His 1570 work Relación de la conquista del Peru is a rare account of the Spanish conquest of the Inca Empire from the vantage point of an Inca elite.

== Rule ==
During his rule at Vilcabamba, the provisional governor-general Lope Garcia de Castro wanted to negotiate with him. The negotiations were about Cusi leaving the Vilcabamba and accepting a Crown pension. After negotiations escalated, around 1568, Titu Cusi was baptised into the Catholic Church, as Diego de Castro.

Titu Cusi made Túpac Amaru a priest and custodian of Manco Inca's body in Vilcabamba.

Túpac Amaru became the Inca ruler after Titu Cusi's death in 1571. Titu Cusi's close companion Martín de Pando, who had worked as a scribe for the Inca for over ten years and Augustinian Friar Diego Ortiz were blamed for killing Titu Cusi by poisoning him. Tito Cusi died after catching a chill while fencing with Pando. Both Ortiz and Pando were subsequently killed.

Cusi is the "narrator" and source of An Inca Account of the Conquest of Peru, a firsthand account of the Spanish invasion, narrated by him in 1570 to Spanish missionary Fray Marcos García and transcribed by Martín de Pando, his mestizo assistant.

The resulting hybrid document offers a unique Inca perspective on the conquest. The confusion and misunderstandings of first contact are described in the account, including beliefs that the Spaniards were gods. The section that describes the moment when Manco Inca Yupanqui, the father of the author and the brother of Atahualpa, receives the first news of the Spaniards' arrival from coastal tribesman is of particular note:

When my father heard this, he was beside himself and said, "How dare those people intrude into my country without my authorisation and permission? Who are these people and what are their ways?" The messengers answered, "Lord, these people cannot but be gods, for they claim to have come by the wind. They are bearded people, very beautiful and white. They eat out of silver plates. Even their Llama, who carry them, are large and wear silver shoes. They throw yllapas like the sky... Moreover, we have witnessed with our own eyes that they talk to white cloths by themselves and that they call some of us by our names without having been informed by anyone and only looking into the sheets, which they hold in front of them... Who could people of this manner and fortune be but Viracochas?"

— Titu Cusi Yapanqui (1570), An Inca Account of the Conquest of Peru

His eldest son was Quispe Titu, born in 1550.

== Bibliography ==
- An Inca Account of the Conquest of Peru by Titu Cusi Yupanqui, trans. Ralph Bauer ISBN 0-87081-821-X
- Andean Worlds by Kenneth J. Andrien ISBN 0-8263-2358-8

Regnal titles
Preceded by Sayri Túpac	Sapa Inca (as ruler of the Neo-Inca State); 1563 – 1571	Succeeded by Túpac Amaru
