= Neo-Inca State =

1537–1572 rump state of the Inca Empire

Realm of the Four Parts (Neo-Inca State) Tawantinsuyu (Quechua)
- 1537–1572
- Sapa Inca banner

- Territory of the Neo-Inca State on a modern map of Peru
- Status: Independent state in Vilcabamba, Vassal of the Spanish Empire (1567–1571)
- Capital: Willkapampa
- Common languages: Quechua
- Religion: Inca religion, Roman Catholicism
- Government: Monarchy
- Sapa Inca
  - 1537–1544: Manco Inca Yupanqui
  - 1545–1560: Sayri Túpac
  - 1563–1571: Titu Cusi
  - 1571–1572: Túpac Amaru I
- Historical era: Early modern
  - Manco Inca Yupanqui created the Neo-Inca state of Vilcabamba: 1537
  - Treaty of Acobamba: 1566
  - Spanish conquest led by Francisco de Toledo: 1572
Preceded by	Succeeded by
Governorate of New Castile; Inca Empire	Viceroyalty of Peru
- Today part of: Peru

The Neo-Inca State, also known as the Neo-Inca state of Vilcabamba, was the Inca state established in 1537 at Vilcabamba by Manco Inca Yupanqui (the son of Inca emperor Huayna Capac). It is considered a rump state of the Inca Empire (1438–1533), which collapsed after the Spanish conquest in the mid-1530s. The Neo-Inca State lasted until 1572, when the last Inca stronghold was conquered, and the last ruler, Túpac Amaru (Manco's son), was captured and executed, thus ending the political authority of the Inca state.

== History ==
=== Inca retreat to Vilcabamba ===
The Vilcabamba region had been part of the Inca Empire since the reign of Pachacuti (1438–1471). During the Spanish conquest of Peru, Túpac Huallpa was a puppet ruler crowned by the conquistador Francisco Pizarro. After his death, Manco Inca Yupanqui joined Francisco Pizarro and Diego de Almagro in Cajamarca. When Pizarro's force arrived in Cusco, he had the caciques acknowledge Manco as their Inca. Manco Inca then joined Almagro and Hernando de Soto in pursuit of Quizquiz.

When Pizarro left Cuzco with Almagro and Manco Inca, for Jauja in pursuit of Quizquiz, Francisco left his younger brothers Gonzalo Pizarro and Juan Pizarro as regidores, and a ninety-man garrison in the city. The Pizarro brothers so mistreated Manco Inca that he ultimately tried to escape in 1535. He failed and was captured and imprisoned. Hernando Pizarro released him to recover a golden statue of his father Huayna Capac. Only accompanied by two Spaniards, he easily escaped a second time. Manco then gathered an army of 100,000 Inca warriors and laid siege to Cusco in early 1536, taking advantage of Diego de Almagro's absence. After ten months (see the Siege of Cuzco), Manco retreated to the nearby fortress of Ollantaytambo in 1537. Here Manco repelled attacks by the Spaniards in the Battle of Ollantaytambo.

Manco coordinated his siege of Cusco with one on Lima, led by one of his captains, Quiso Yupanqui. The Incans were able to defeat four relief expeditions sent by Francisco Pizarro from Lima. This resulted in the death of nearly 500 Spanish soldiers. Some Spaniards were captured and sent to Ollantaytambo. However, with the Spaniards' position consolidated by Almagro's reinforcements, Manco Inca decided that Ollantaytambo was too close to Cusco to be tenable so he withdrew further west. Abandoning Ollantaytambo (and effectively giving up the highlands of the empire), Manco Inca retreated to Vitcos and finally to the remote jungles of Vilcabamba.

=== Coexistence with Spain ===
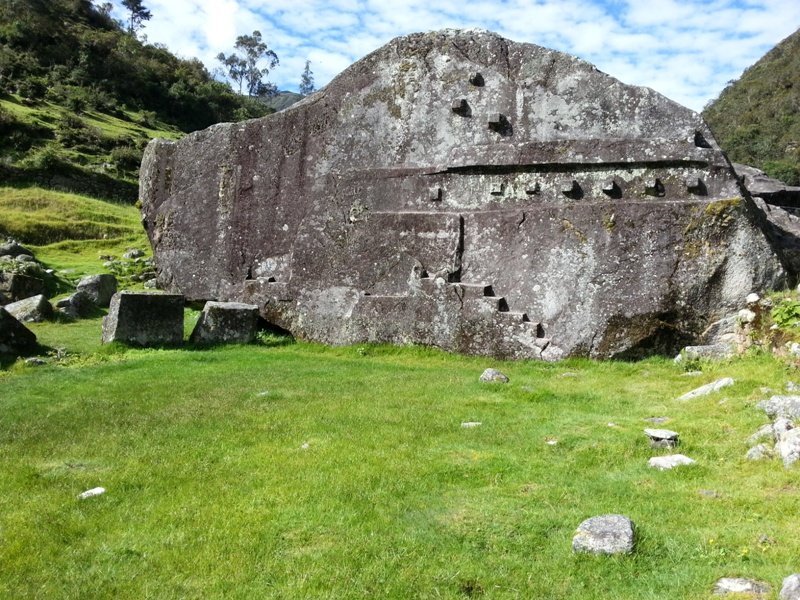
The Yuraq Rumi shrine, which was burnt by Spanish priests in 1570

At Vilcabamba the state known as the Neo-Inca State was established by Manco, and Vilcabamba became the capital of the state until the death of Tupaq Amaru in 1572. From there, he continued his attacks against the Wankas (one of the most important allies of the Spaniards), having some success after fierce battles, and to the highlands of present-day Bolivia, where after many battles his army was defeated. After many guerrilla battles in the mountainous regions of Vilcabamba, Manco was murdered in 1544 by supporters of Diego de Almagro who had previously assassinated Francisco Pizarro and who were in hiding under Manco's protection. They in turn were all killed by Manco's soldiers.

Manco was succeeded by his son Sayri Túpac (Sayri Tupaq). He was nine years old at the time. He became Inca in Vilcabamba, reigning for sixteen years with the aid of regents. This was a time of peace with the Spanish. Viceroy Pedro de la Gasca offered to provide Sayri Túpac with lands and houses in Cuzco if he would emerge from the isolated Vilcabamba. Sayri Túpac accepted, but during the preparations his relative Paullu Inca suddenly died. This was taken as a bad omen (or a sign of Spanish treachery), and Sayri Túpac remained in Vilcabamba. In 1557 Sayri Túpac did agree to leave Vilcabamba and traveled to Viceroy Hurtado in Lima. Sayri Túpac renounced his claim to the Inca Empire and accepted baptism as Diego. In return he received a full pardon, the title of Prince of Yucay, and great estates with rich revenues. He became resident in Yucay, a day's journey northeast of Cuzco. Significantly, he left behind the royal red fringe, symbol of his authority.

In 1560, Sayri Túpac died suddenly, and his half-brother Titu Cusi Yupanqui took control of Vilcabamba and the Inca resistance to the Spanish. During his rule at Vilcabamba, the provisional governor-general Lope Garcia de Castro wanted to negotiate with him. The negotiations were about Cusi leaving the Vilcabamba and accepting a Crown pension. After negotiations escalated, around 1568, Titi Cusi was baptised into the Roman Catholic Church, as Diego de Castro.

Túpac Amaru became the Inca ruler after Titu Cusi's sudden death in 1571. At this time, the Spanish were still unaware of the death of the previous Sapa Inca (Titu Cusi) and had routinely sent two ambassadors to continue ongoing negotiations being held with Titu Cusi. They were both killed on the border by an Inca captain. Using the justification that the Incas had "broken the inviolate law observed by all nations of the world regarding ambassadors" the new Viceroy, Francisco de Toledo, Count of Oropesa, decided to attack and conquer Vilcabamba. He declared war against the Neo-Inca State on 14 April 1572.

=== Final conquest ===
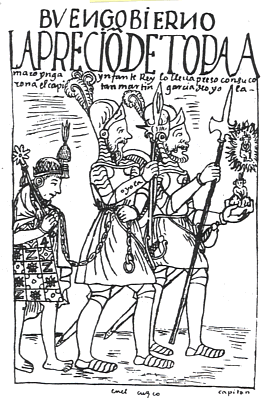
Túpac Amaru after his capture by the Spanish

Within two weeks after the declaration of war a small party of Spanish soldiers had captured a key bridge on the border of the Neo-Inca State, from which Toledo assembled his army. On 1 June, the first engagement of the war commenced in the Vilcabamba valley. The Inca initially attacked with high morale, despite being poorly equipped. Repeatedly, the Inca attempted to lift the siege held by the Spanish and their native allies but were forced to retreat. On 23 June, the fort of Huayna Pucará surrendered to Spanish artillery fire. The Inca army now in retreat opted to abandon their last city and head for the jungle to regroup. On 24 June, the Spanish entered Vilcabamba to find it deserted and the Sapa Inca gone. The city had been entirely destroyed and the Neo-Inca State officially ceased to exist. Túpac Amaru was later captured and executed by the Spanish.

== Adoption of Spanish warfare ==
The Incan military was swift to adopt European weaponry; many warriors captured helmets, shields, and swords during the initial clashes with the Europeans and quickly learned how to use them. In marked contrast with some other Native American cultures, including the Aztec, the Incans were also eager to master weaponry which was wholly alien to them. As early as 1537, when Manco Inca defeated the Spanish at Pilcosuni, they came into possession of more advanced Spanish weapons, including arquebuses, artillery, and crossbows. By the later stages of the Siege of Cusco, the Spaniards were already reporting that Incan warriors were using captured firearms as well as horses with some proficiency. Manco Inca even forced captured Europeans to refine gunpowder for his army.

The Incans also tried to adopt some European battle tactics. On at least one occasion, a group of Incan warriors formed a tight unit in combat, based on the teachings of a captured Spaniard, and used their bows, slings, and darts in a way to achieve more rapid fire. In 1538, Manco Inca was recorded to be skilled enough to ride a horse into battle; by this point, he and three of his nobles were recorded as carrying out a cavalry charge which destroyed a 30-man strong Spanish infantry contingent. However, the Incans' skill in using some modern weaponry was still lacking at this point, and chronicler Pedro Pizarro reported that Incan arquebusiers often misfired. In the 1536–1538 battles between the Incans and the Spanish, captured weaponry made no lasting difference.

But early in the 1540s, several Spanish immigrants to the Neo-Inca State would teach Incan warriors how to use Spanish weapons to their full potential. Overall, it took the Incans about two decades to bridge the technological gap with the Spanish. By the 1560s, it was recorded that many Incans had developed considerable skill in using arquebuses and riding horses.

== See also ==
- Túpac Amaru
