= Vilcabamba, Peru =

Capital of the Neo-Inca State

Vilcabamba
- Willkapampa (Quechua)
- Vilcabamba la Vieja; Espíritu Pampa
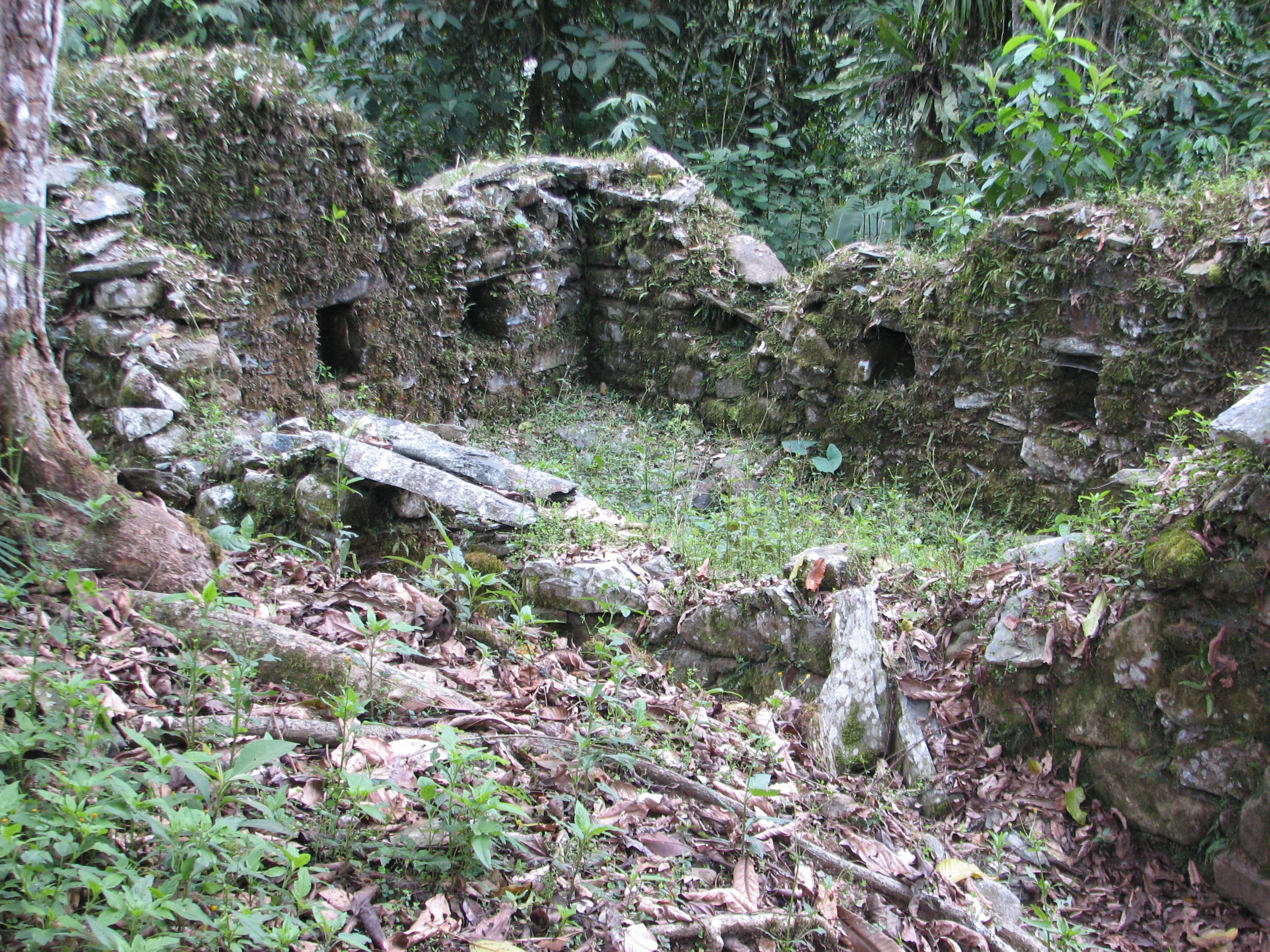
- Ruins of Espíritu Pampa

- Location within Peru
- 12.904°S 73.203°W
- Type: Settlement
- Cultures: Neo-Inca State
- Location: La Convención Province
- Region: Cuzco Department

History
- Built: 1539
- Built by: Manco Inca Yupanqui
- Abandoned: 1572

Site notes
- Elevation: 1,458 m (4,783 ft)

Vilcabamba (in Hispanicized spelling) or Willkapampa (Aymara and Quechua), often called the Lost City of the Incas, is a lost city in the Echarate District of La Convención Province in the Cuzco Region of Peru. Vilcabamba, in Quechua, means "sacred plain". The modern name for the Inca ruins of Vilcabamba is Espíritu Pampa (Plain of the Spirits).

Vilcabamba was the capital of the Neo-Inca State from 1539 to 1572. The Neo-Inca State was the last refuge of the Inca Empire until it fell to the Spaniards and their indigenous allies in 1572, signaling the end of Inca resistance to Spanish rule. Subsequently, Vilcabamba was abandoned and its location forgotten. In 1911 explorer Hiram Bingham mistakenly identified the abandoned ruin of Machu Picchu as Vilcabamba, but he also visited a ruin called Espiritu Pampa by local Peruvians. In 1964, Gene Savoy identified Espiritu Pampa as the fabled Vilcabamba, a designation widely accepted by archaeologists and historians.

Not to be confused with Vilcabamba, Ecuador, Vilcabamba or Espiritu Pampa is located near the Chontabamba River, a tributary of the Urubamba River. The Inca capital has often been referred to as Vilcabamba the Old to distinguish it from the town of Vilcabamba the New, of Spanish origin and 35 kilometres (22 miles) in straight-line distance southeast of Old Vilcabamba.

In 2010, items belonging to the Wari culture and radiocarbon dated to about 700 AD were found at Espiritu Pampa. This discovery indicated that the site was occupied long before it became the Inca capital in 1539. As of 2013, archaeological investigations of the site were incomplete and the ruins of Espiritu Pampa were inaccessible by vehicle.

== History ==
La Convención province in which Vilcabamba is located is extremely rugged, occupying the north-eastern slopes of the Andes and sloping down to the Amazon Basin. The terrain includes snow-covered mountains, forest, lowland jungle, and rivers running through deep canyons. Access and transportation within the area was difficult and would hinder Spanish efforts to destroy the last outposts of the Inca Empire.

The Incas had occupied the Vilcabamba region since about 1450 AD, establishing major centers at Machu Picchu, Choquequirao, Vitcos, and Vilcabamba. Thus, the Incas were familiar with the region when Inca emperor Manco Inca Yupanqui won the Battle of Ollantaytambo against the Spanish and their indigenous allies in January 1537. Despite the victory, Manco was under intense pressure from the Spanish. He decided that Ollantaytambo was too close to Cusco, controlled by the Spanish, so he withdrew westward to the Inca center of Vitcos. The Spanish conquistador Diego de Almagro sent his lieutenant Rodrigo Orgóñez in pursuit, with 300 Spaniards and numerous indigenous allies. In July 1537, Orgoñez occupied and sacked Vitcos, taking many prisoners, but Manco escaped.

Manco Inca survived another Spanish raid in 1539 by Gonzalo Pizarro, 300 Spanish soldiers, and indigenous allies. The Spanish and the Incas fought a battle at Huayna Pukara (Huayna Fort), west of Vitcos and about 22 kilometres (14 miles) from Vilcabamba. Several Spaniards and indigenous enemies were killed, and Manco again escaped. Pizarro stayed in the region for more than two months searching for Manco unsuccessfully, but capturing Manco's principal wife Cura Ocllo. The Spaniards wrote of the region that "great resources are needed to undertake a penetration of that land. It can be done only with very heavy expenditure." The Spanish would not attempt another major military expedition into Vilcabamba until 1572. As the two Spanish raids demonstrated, Vitcos was accessible to the Spanish and Manco developed Vilcabamba as a more remote refuge.

In the years following the Spanish raids, the Incas and the Spaniards maintained uneasy diplomatic relations with visits back and forth between Vilcabamba and Cuzco, the Spanish capital. The murder of a Spanish envoy by the Incas persuaded Viceroy of Peru Francisco de Toledo to conquer the Vilcabamba region and end Inca rule. On June 24, 1572, a Spanish army, led by veteran conquistador Martin Hurtado de Arbieto, made a final advance on the Incas' remote jungle capital. "At 10 o'clock," wrote Hurtado in his account of the campaign, "they marched into the city of Vilcabamba, all on foot, for it is the most wild and rugged country, in no way suitable for horses." What they discovered was a city built "for about a thousand fighting Indians, besides many other women, children, and old people" filled with "four hundred houses."

After the fall of Vilcabamba, the Spanish pursued and captured Túpac Amaru, the last Inca monarch, and beheaded him in Cusco on September 24, 1572.

=== Spanish Vilcabamba ===
In 1572, the conqueror and governor of Vilcabamba, Martin Hurtado de Arbieto, founded San Francisco de la Victoria de Vilcabamba, also known as Vilcabamba la Nueva ("the New"), 5 kilometres (3.1 miles) west of Vitcos. It is located on the Pampaconas River, a tributary of the Vilcabamba River, which is a tributary of the Urubamba River. Hurtado was a brutal administrator, offering encomiendas to Spanish soldiers and making the local indigenous people virtual slaves. Many of them died, or abandoned their homes and fled elsewhere. Silver deposits were discovered nearby and the town enjoyed a brief boom, although the production of the mines was meager and by the early 17th century Vilcabamba the New and the Vilcabamba region was no longer of much interest to the Spanish. Hiram Bingham visited the town in 1911, noting that, "Instead of Inca walls or ruins, Vilcabamba has three score solidly built Spanish houses...due to the prosperity of gold diggers, who came to work the quartz mines which were made accessible after the death of Tupac Amaru." Catholic clerics had built a church and a monastery in the town.

== The lost city ==
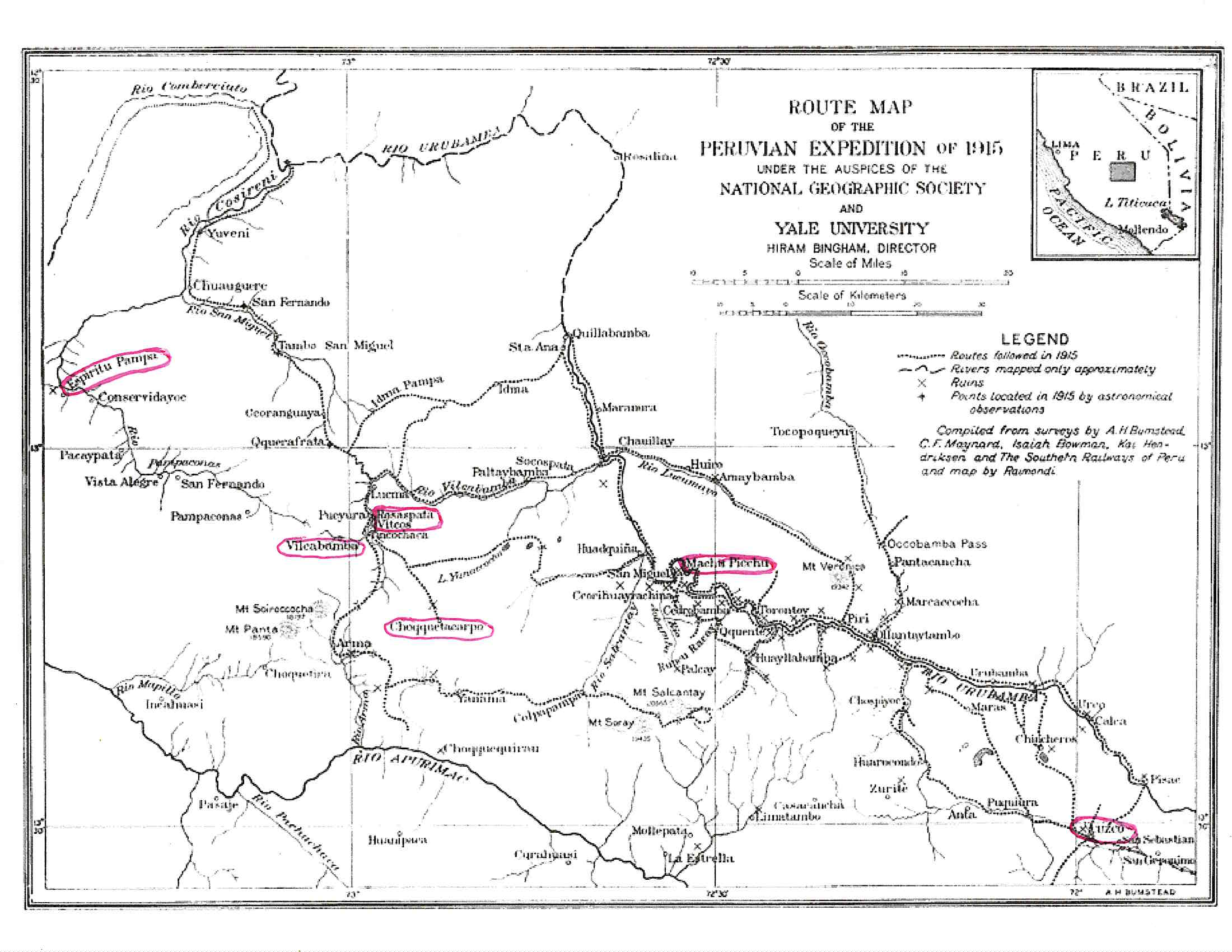
Bingham's map of Vilcabamba. Important places circled. Espiritu Pampa is Incan Vilcabamba.

The location of the Incan Vilcabamba was forgotten during the 17th century by the few remaining inhabitants of the region. In 1710, an explorer, Juan Arias Diaz, found Choquequirao, 70 kilometres (43 miles) southeast of Vilcabamba, and identified it as the Incan capital. Later historians and explorers identified Choquequirao as Vilcabamba. In 1909, Peruvian historian, Carlos A. Romero, debunked the claim that Choquequirao was Incan Vilcabamba based on his studies of writings by Spanish chroniclers of the 16th century. Romero identified the village of Puquiura as the site of Incan Vilcabamba.

In 1911, Hiram Bingham was on the expedition which resulted in him bringing to a wider world attention the Incan ruin of Machu Picchu. Romero pointed him toward Puquiura as the site of Vilcabamba, and Bingham discovered there the ruins of Rosaspata. He correctly identified Rosaspata as the Incan Vitcos rather than Incan Vilcabamba. Drawn by rumors of another lost Inca ruin in the lowland forest, Bingham ignored tales of a hostile plantation owner and dangerous native peoples and proceeded onward. After a difficult three days of foot travel, he found the plantation. Its owner and the Asháninka indigenous peoples working there were friendly and helpful. They assisted him in cutting a trail through the jungle and two days later he found Inca ruins at a place called Espiritu Pampa. He found artificial terraces, stone houses, including a rectangular building 192 feet (59 m) long, a fountain, Inca pottery, and a stone bridge. But Bingham was running out of supplies and only spent a short time at Espiritu Pampa. Based on his brief observations, Bingham concluded that Machu Picchu was the Incan Vilcabamba. That opinion went largely unchallenged for 50 years.

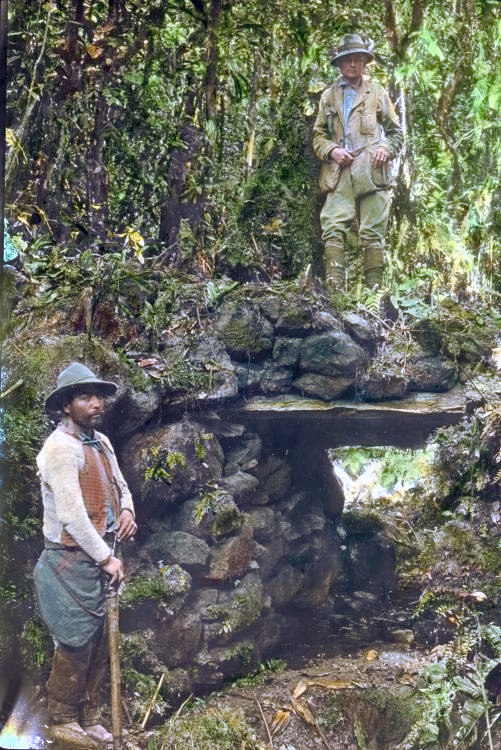
Hiram Bingham III (upper right) with a local guide on a jungle bridge at Vilcabamba, hand-colored glass slide, 1911

In 1964, Peruvian explorer Antonio Santander Caselli visited Espiritu Pampa and later claimed the discovery that Espiritu Pampa was the Incan Vilcabamba. In the same month, American explorer Gene Savoy reached Espiritu Pampa. He discovered that Bingham had only seen a minor part of the ruin at Eremboni Pampa and that the main ruin of Espiritu Pampa was 700 yards (640 m) distant. Savoy found 50 or 60 houses and 300 houses at Espiritu Pampa. Savoy concluded that Espiritu Pampa was Vilcabamba, contradicting Bingham. Savoy's 1970 book Antisuyo brought the site to even wider attention.

Researcher and author John Hemming also concluded the Espiritu Pampa was Incan Vilcabamba in his 1970 book The Conquest of the Incas. He cited contemporary Spanish and Inca accounts of Vilcabamba as evidence. Titu Cusi Yupanqui said that Vilcambamba had a "warm climate," unlike Vitcos which was in "a cold district." This statement is consistent with the elevation of the two places: 1,450 metres (4,760 ft) for Espiritu Pampa and 2,980 metres (9,780 ft) for Vitcos. Moreover, both the conqueror of Vilcabamba, Hurtado de Abierto, and chronicler Martín de Murúa cited the tropical crops--coca, cotton, and sugar cane—grown near Vilcabamba and that the city lay in a "hot country" unlike most Inca cities. The Inca preferred to live in the high, cool climate of the Andes. Hurtado also described Vilcabamba as being in a valley with "pastures for cattle," unlike Machu Picchu which is on a steep ridge. Finally, Hemming cited Spanish sources indicating that Vilcabamba was northwest of Vitcos—unlike Machu Picchu which is east of Vitcos. Thus, Bingham's claim that Machu Picchu was Incan Vilcabamba and other claims that Vitcos was Vilcabamba were discredited.

In 1976, Professor Edmundo Guillén and Polish explorers Tony Halik and Elżbieta Dzikowska continued to explore the ruins at Espiritu Pampa. Before the expedition, Guillen visited a museum in Seville where he discovered letters from Spaniards, in which they described the progress of the invasion and what they found in Vilcabamba. Comparison between the letters' contents and the ruins provided additional proof of Espiritu Pampa as the location of Vilcabamba.

In 1981, the party of American explorer Gregory Deyermenjian reached and photographed parts of the site, soon thereafter generating a popular article concerning the site and its history.

Later extensive archeological work by Vincent Lee, and especially his exhaustive study, his 2000 book Forgotten Vilcabamba, gave further and even more precise confirmation that has made Espíritu Pampa the definitively accepted site of the historical Vilcabamba.

On 16 June 2006, a museum in Cuzco unveiled a plaque that commemorates the thirtieth anniversary of the 1976 Vilcabamba findings.

In 2011 the tomb of a king was discovered in Espíritu Pampa, which is estimated to date to the Wari period. The discovery testifies that the Vilcabamba site was inhabited since ancient times and that was almost certainly used as a center of commercial exchange between the people of the lowland jungle and the inhabitants of the Andean highlands.

== In popular culture ==
The lost city of Vilcabamba features as a location in the educational computer game series The Amazon Trail, the action-adventure video game Tomb Raider, and the role-playing video game Shadow Hearts: From the New World. It also appears in the books Evil Star and Necropolis by British thriller author Anthony Horowitz.

The city was the location of British writer Colin Thubron's 2002 novel, To the Last City, which was short-listed for the Man Booker Prize, and tells the story of a group of people who set off to explore the ruins of the Inca city in what has been described as a "Heart of Darkness narrative" in a "Marquezian setting".

The science fiction story "Vilcabamba" (2010) by Harry Turtledove is a self-referential allegory of Vilcabamba as an alien invasion story set in the 22nd century.

An episode of the TV Series In Search of... (1976-1982) titled "Inca Treasures", highlights the expedition taken by professor Edmundo Guillén to explore the ruins of Vilcabamba.

The second episode of Michael Wood's 2000 documentary series Conquistadors visits the site of Vilcabamba while telling the story of the fall of the Inca and retreat of Manco and his followers to the remote region as the last surviving remains of the empire.

== Gallery ==
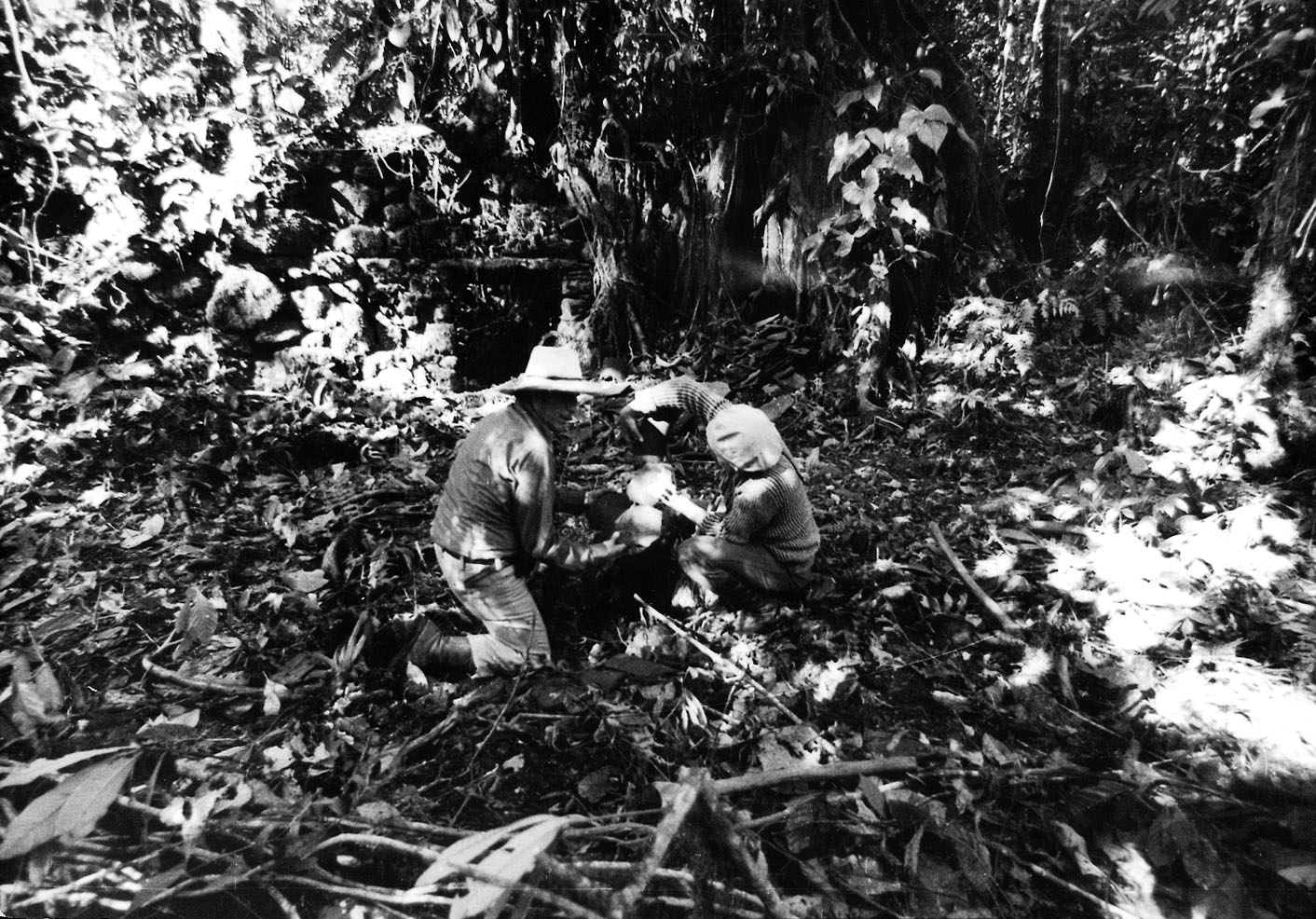
Edmundo Guillén and Elżbieta Dzikowska in the ruins of Vilcabamba, photo taken by Tony Halik in 1976

Tree over structure

Vilcabamba

Inca waterfall

Inca waterfall

== See also ==
- List of archaeological sites in Peru
- Ñusta Hisp'ana
- Spanish conquest of Peru
- Túpac Amaru

== Bibliography ==
- Hemming, John (1970). The Conquest of the Incas. New York: Harcourt Brace Jovanovich. ISBN 978-0-15-602826-4.
- Bingham, Hiram (1952). Lost City of the Incas. Phoenix House. ISBN 1-84212-585-0.
- Deyermenjian, Gregory (1985). "Vilcabamba Revisited" (PDF). South American Explorer. No. 12. Archived from the original (PDF) on 2015-09-15.
- Lee, Vincent R. (2000). Forgotten Vilcabamba: Final Stronghold of the Incas. Wilson, Wyoming: Sixpac Manco Publications. ISBN 978-0-9677109-0-7.
- MacQuarrie, Kim (2007). The Last Days of the Incas. New York: Simon & Schuster. ISBN 978-0-7432-6049-7. Internet Archive copy is currently only available to registered users with print disabilities (21 February 2024).
- Santander Casselli, Antonio (no date) "Vilcabamba" in Andanzas de un Soñador.
- Savoy, Gene (1970). Antisuyo: The Search for the Lost Cities of the Amazon. New York: Simon & Schuster. ISBN 978-0-671-20220-0.
- Waisbard, Simone (1979). The Mysteries of Machu Picchu. New York: Avon Books. ISBN 0-380-43687-6.
