= Elżbieta Dzikowska =

Polish art historian explorer

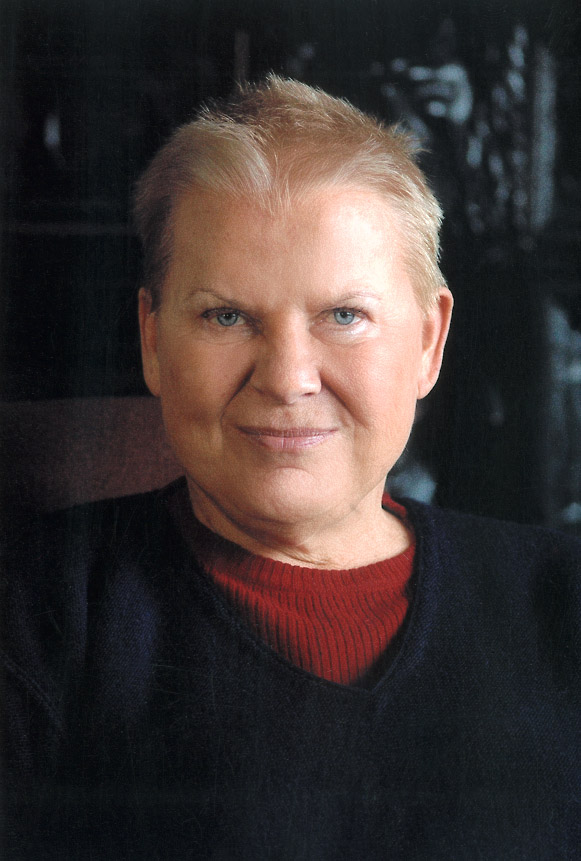
- Elżbieta Dzikowska
- Born: Józefa Górska; March 19, 1937 (age 88); Międzyrzec Podlaski, Poland
- Occupation(s): Art historian, explorer
- Years active: 1957-present
- Spouse: Tony Halik

Elżbieta Dzikowska (Międzyrzec Podlaski, 19 March 1937 as Józefa Górska) is a Polish art historian, sinologist, explorer, director and operator of documentary films, the author of many books, television programs, radio broadcasts, articles and exhibitions of contemporary art.

Along with her life partner, Tony Halik, she has made about 300 documentary films all over the world for Polish Television and hosted the popular travel television programme "Pieprz i wanilia" ("Pepper and Vanilla").

== Books by Elżbieta Dzikowska ==
- Niełatwo być Indianinem, Wydawnictwo Książka i Wiedza, 1976, seria: "Kontynenty"
- Limańskie ABC, Wydawnictwo Iskry, 1982, ISBN 83-207-0253-4
- Tropem złota, Wydawnictwo Ministerstwa Obrony Narodowej, 1970
- Hombre, Wydawnictwo Ministerstwa Obrony Narodowej, 1973
- Vilcabamba - ostatnia stolica Inków, Krajowa Agencja Wydawnicza, 1979
- Czarownicy, Dom Słowa Polskiego, 1991, ISBN 83-207-0487-1
- Polacy w sztuce świata, Rosikon Press, 2001, ISBN 83-911163-9-5 (książka wyróżniona przez Polskie Towarzystwo Wydawców Książek tytułem Najpiękniejszej Książki Roku 2000, Nagroda Główna w Konkursie Edycja oraz Nagroda Główna w Plebiscycie Dziennikarzy na Najpiękniejszą Książkę)
- Groch i kapusta, czyli podróżuj po Polsce, tom 1, Rosikon Press, 2004, ISBN 83-88848-13-5
- Groch i kapusta, czyli podróżuj po Polsce, tom 2, Rosikon Press, 2005, ISBN 83-88848-22-4 (nagroda Bursztynowego Motyla im. Arkadego Fiedlera za najlepszą książkę podróżniczą 2005 roku)
- Groch i kapusta, czyli podróżuj po Polsce, tom 3, Rosikon Press, 2006, ISBN 83-88848-34-8
- W Sztuce Świata. Polscy artyści, Rosikon Press, 2005, ISBN 83-88848-27-5
- Panek-Gielniak. Życie. Przyjaźń. Sztuka. Korespondencja 1962-1972, Biblioteka Narodowa, 2005, ISBN 83-7009-588-7 (z Wiesławą Wierzchowską)
- Uśmiech świata, Rosikon Press, 2006, ISBN 83-88848-44-5
- Groch i kapusta. Podróżuj po Polsce! Południowy zachód, Rosikon Press, 2009, ISBN 978-83-88848-69-8
- Groch i kapusta. Podróżuj po Polsce! Północny zachód, Rosikon Press, 2009, ISBN 978-83-88848-70-4
- Groch i kapusta. Podróżuj po Polsce! Północny wschód, Rosikon Press, 2009, ISBN 978-83-88848-72-8
- Groch i kapusta. Podróżuj po Polsce! Południowy wschód , Rosikon Press, 2009, ISBN 978-83-88848-71-1

== Gallery of photos ==
Examples of photos by Elżbieta Dzikowska
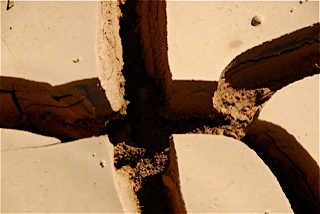
Mud, Mongolia

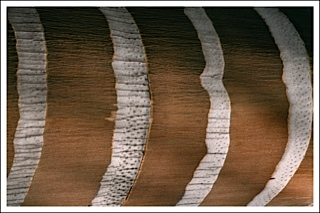
Bark, world

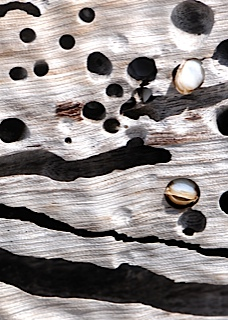
Little scallops on a wood trunk, Gabon

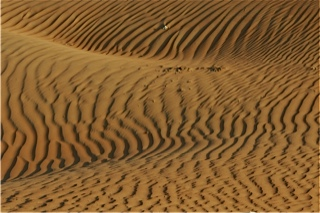
Sand, world

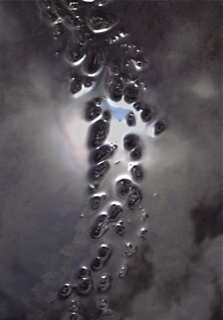
Water, world

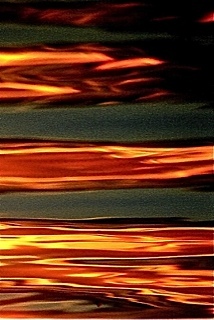
Water, world

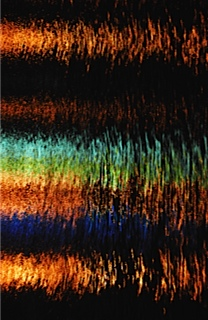
Water, world

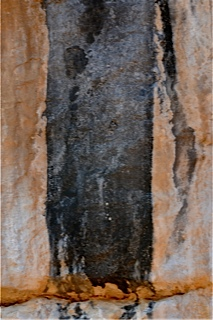
Stains on rocks, Madagaskar

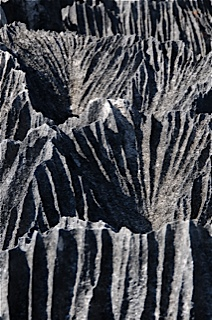
Soil, Mongolia
