= Sybil Moseley Bingham =

American teacher in the Hawaiian Islands (1792–1848)

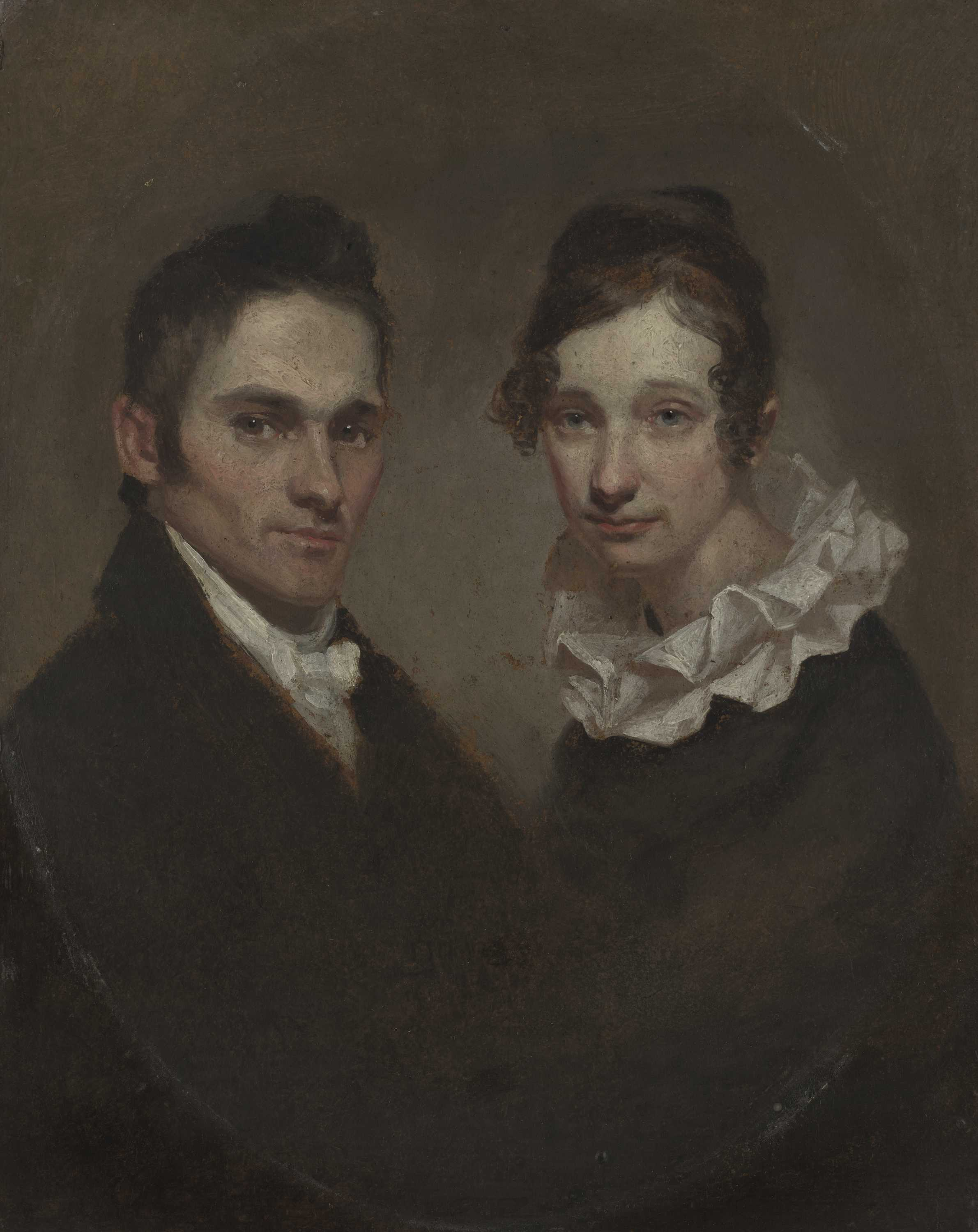
Portraits of Hiram and Sybil Moseley Bingham, 1819, by Samuel F. B. Morse

Sybil Moseley Bingham (September 14, 1792 – February 27, 1848) was an American teacher in the Hawaiian Islands, a member of the first company of missionaries sent by the American Board of Commissioners for Foreign Missions (ABCFM).

== Early life ==
Sybil Moseley was born in Westfield, Massachusetts, the daughter of Pliny Moseley and Sophia Pomeroy Moseley. She was an orphan by age twenty, left to support three younger sisters. She was a teacher for nine years as a young woman, some of that time living in Canandaigua, New York.

== Mission years in Hawaii ==
Hiram Bingham I was a missionary in Honolulu for twenty years, from 1820 to 1840, and founder of the Kawaiahaʻo Church. As his wife, Sybil Moseley Bingham shared the work. "I believe God appoints my work," she wrote in her journal in 1823, "and it is enough for me to see that I do it all with an eye to his glory." She is credited with starting the first missionary school in the Hawaiian Islands, teaching Hawaiian adults in her home. The Binghams helped to develop a written Hawaiian alphabet, and some of the first printed materials in Hawaiian were made for use in her classes. She founded a weekly prayer meeting, attended by more than a thousand Hawaiian women. She also served as an unofficial nurse and midwife among the missionary families.

After 1829, the Binghams lived in the Manoa Valley, on a banana and sugarcane plantation given for their use by Queen Kaahumanu. The estate later became the site of the Punahou School.

== Personal life and legacy ==
Sybil Moseley married Hiram Bingham in 1819; they had met a few weeks before, and boarded a ship for Hawaii twelve days later. Samuel F. B. Morse painted a portrait of the newlyweds before they left New England. Sybil Moseley Bingham and her husband returned to New England in 1841; she was ill with tuberculosis, and died in 1848, in Easthampton, Massachusetts.

The Binghams had seven children, all born in the Hawaiian Islands, beginning with Sophia Bingham, the first female American missionary child born on Oahu. Another daughter, Lydia Bingham Coan, wrote a biography of Sybil Moseley Bingham, published in 1895. Two sons died in infancy, in 1823 and 1825; Hiram Bingham II was the only surviving son. Her grandson Hiram Bingham III was an explorer in South America, a Senator, and Governor of Connecticut. Her grandson Edwin Lincoln Moseley was a naturalist. Her great-grandson Hiram Bingham IV was an American diplomat; another great-grandson, Jonathan Brewster Bingham, was a Congressman. Living descendants of Sybil Moseley Bingham include musician Sam Endicott.

The Bingham family's papers, including Sybil's journal of her life in Hawaii in the 1820s, are archived at Yale University, with another large collection at the Hawaiian Historical Society and the Hawaiian Mission Children's Society Library in Honolulu, donated by a descendant in 1966.
