= 1920 Connecticut Senate election =

1920 Election of Senators from the US state of Connecticut

- November 3, 1920

All 35 seats in the Connecticut State Senate 18 seats needed for a majority
| | Majority party | Minority party |
|---|---|---|
| Leader | George W. Klett | Charles C. Hemenway |
| Party | Republican | Democratic |
| Leader's seat | District 6 | District 2 (lost) |
| Last election | 24 | 11 |
| Seats won | 34 | 1 |
| Seat change | ▲10 | ▼10 |
| Popular vote | 227,033 | 123,857 |
| Percentage | 62.9% | 34.3% |
President pro tempore of the Senate before election
William H. Heald
Republican
Elected President pro tempore of the Senate
William H. Hall
Republican

The Connecticut Senate election, 1920 was held on November 2, 1920, to elect all 35 Senators to the Connecticut State Senate for the term which began in January 1921 and ended in January 1923. It occurred on the same date as other federal and state elections, including the state's gubernatorial election.

The election saw 34 Republicans win election or re-election, and 1 Democrat win election. 10 seats flipped from Democratic to Republican.

== Results ==
Results of the 1920 Connecticut Senate election. Party shading denotes winner of Senate seat.

| District | Constituency | Incumbent Senator | Republican candidate (percent won) | Democratic candidate (percent won) |
|---|---|---|---|---|
| 1 | Hartford Wards 8, 9, 10 | Edward D. Broder (D) | Clarence W. Seymour; 59.3% | Josephine Maxim^{1} 35.6% |
| 2 | Hartford Wards 3, 4, 5, 6 | Charles C. Hemenway (D) | F. Spencer Goodwin; 54.2% | Saul Berman; 39.7% |
| 3 | Hartford Wards 1, 2, 7 | Herman P. Koppleman (D) | Louis B. Rosenfeld; 48.0% | Thomas F. Dignam; 40.7% |
| 4 | East Hartford, Glastonbury, Manchester, Marlborough, Newington, South Windsor, Rocky Hill, Wethersfield | Arthur E. Bowers (R) | Arthur E. Bowers; 65.2% | Edward G. Dolan; 34.8% |
| 5 | Avon, Berlin, Bristol, Burlington, Farmington, Plainville, Southington, West Hartford | Richard H. Deming (R) | John H. Trumbull; 68.6% | Charles H. Curtis; 31.4% |
| 6 | New Britain | George W. Klett (R) | Edward F. Hall; 67.9% | Abraham M. Gorbach; 32.1% |
| 7 | Bloomfield, Canton, East Granby, East Windsor, Enfield, Granby, Hartland, Simsbury, Suffield, Windsor, Windsor Locks | Albert H. House (R) | Richard B. Eno; 64.5% | Fred H. Thrall; 35.5% |
| 8 | New Haven Wards 8, 9, 12, and 14 | G. Herbert Bishop (D) | Charles M. Bakewell; 59.7% | Patrick F. O'Meara; 35.4% |
| 9 | New Haven Wards 1, 2, 10, and 13 | Harry A. Leonard (R) | James H. MacDonald; 72.7% | Fred D. Faulkner; 24.3% |
| 10 | New Haven Wards 3, 4, and 5 | Dennis J. Bailey (D) | Hugh McCahey; 49.2% | Daniel L. Bailey; 42.4% |
| 11 | New Haven Wards 6, 7, 11, and 15 | Dennis M. Clyne (D) | Lorenzo C. Furcolo; 47.0% | Dennis M. Clyne; 38.2% |
| 12 | Branford, East Haven, Guilford, Hamden, Madison, North Branford, North Haven, Wallingford | Arthur W. Marsden (R) | John W. Sanford; 69.3% | J.P. Craig; 22.9% |
| 13 | Meriden | Eugene P. Golden (R) | Eugene P. Golden; 62.5% | Harold C. Hall; 35.1% |
| 14 | Bethany, Cheshire, Milford, Naugatuck, Orange^{2}, Prospect, Woodbridge, Wolcott | Watson R. Woodruff (R) | Charles R. Treat; 69.0% | Arthur H. Doolittle; 27.1% |
| 15 | Waterbury Wards 1, 2, 3, and 6 | Charles A. Templeton (R) | Lancaster P. Clark; 58.2% | Alfred Lachance; 38.1% |
| 16 | Waterbury Wards 4 and 5 | John Hurley (D) | Arnold Rasmussen; 35.3% | Daniel F. Pickett; 62.1% |
| 17 | Ansonia, Beacon Falls, Derby, Middlebury, Oxford, Seymour, Southbury | Raymond T. French (D) | Frederick M. Drew; 56.0% | John W. Schumacher; 42.0% |
| 18 | Groton, New London | William C. Fox (D) | Cornelius C. Costello; 62.5% | William C. Fox; 35.3% |
| 19 | Ledyard, Norwich, Preston | William B. Wilcox (D) | Allyn L. Brown; 58.7% | Charles S. Avery; 38.9% |
| 20 | Bozrah, Colchester, East Lyme, Franklin, Griswold, Lyme, Lebanon, Lisbon, Montville, North Stonington, Old Lyme, Salem, Sprague, Stonington, Voluntown, Waterford | Elisha Waterman (R) | James Graham; 68.2% | John S. Sullivan; 31.8% |
| 21 | Bridgeport Voting Districts 1, 2, 3, 4, and 5 | Frederic A. Bartlett (R) | Earle E. Garlick; 61.9% | John F. Mograin; 30.3% |
| 22 | Bridgeport Voting Districts 6, 7, 8, and 11 | Alexander L. DeLaney (R) | Alexander L. DeLaney; 61.8% | Lawrence T. Gallagher; 33.6% |
| 23 | Bridgeport Voting Districts 9, 10, and 12 | George B. Clark (D) | Howard S. Challenger; 62.3% | George B. Clark; 32.8% |
| 24 | Bethel, Brookfield, Danbury, New Fairfield, Redding, Ridgefield, Sherman | Harvey P. Bissell (R) | Edward H. Bailey; 65.5% | George Taylor; 34.5% |
| 25 | Easton, Fairfield, Shelton, Monroe, Newtown, Stratford, Trumbull, Weston, Westport | John B. Dillon (R) | Elmore S. Banks; 70.9% | John W. Treadwell; 29.1% |
| 26 | Darien, New Canaan, Wilton, Norwalk | Charles E. Williamson (R) | Nehemiah Candee; 68.5% | Edward J. Quinian; 31.5% |
| 27 | Greenwich, Stamford | James R. Mead (R) | Matthew H. Kenealy; 71.8% | William P. Mulville; 28.2% |
| 28 | Ashford, Eastford, Killingly, Putnam, Thompson, Woodstock | Archibald Macdonald (R) | Archibald Macdonald; 65.1% | John O. Fox; 34.8% |
| 29 | Brooklyn, Canterbury, Chaplin, Hampton, Plainfield, Pomfret, Scotland, Sterling, Windham | Sessions L. Adams (R) | Charles H. Blake; 58.9% | Charles H. Williams; 41.0% |
| 30 | Goshen, Harwinton, Litchfield, New Hartford, Torrington | John N. Brooks (R) | John N. Brooks; 68.0% | William P. Driscoll; 32.0% |
| 31 | Barkhamsted, Canaan, Colebrook, Cornwall, Kent, Norfolk, North Canaan, Salisbury, Sharon, Winchester | Dwight B. Tiffany (R) | Malcolm D. Rudd; 65.5% | Edward D. Cartwright; 34.4% |
| 32 | Bethlehem, Bridgewater, Morris, New Milford, Plymouth, Roxbury, Thomaston, Warren, Washington, Watertown, Woodbury | Clifford E. Hough (R) | Clarence B. Emery; 65.8% | Charles T. Davis; 34.2% |
| 33 | Cromwell, Middlefield, Middletown | George F. Chapin (R) | Dale D. Butler; 60.1% | Maurice E. Miner; 39.9% |
| 34 | Chester, Clinton, Durham, East Haddam, East Hampton, Essex, Haddam, Killingworth, Old Saybrook, Portland, Saybrook^{3}, Westbrook | Edward W. Hazen (R) | Mathewson W. Potter; 70.3% | Horace E. Kelsey; 29.7% |
| 35 | Andover, Bolton, Columbia, Coventry, Ellington, Hebron, Mansfield, Somers, Stafford, Tolland, Union, Vernon, Willington | William H. Heald (R) | William H. Hall; 69.7% | William S. Ellis; 30.3% |

Notes
^{1} Wife of Hiram Percy Maxim.
^{2} Includes West Haven, in 1920 it was a borough of Orange
^{3} Today known as Deep River.
