= 1922 Connecticut gubernatorial election =

- November 7, 1922
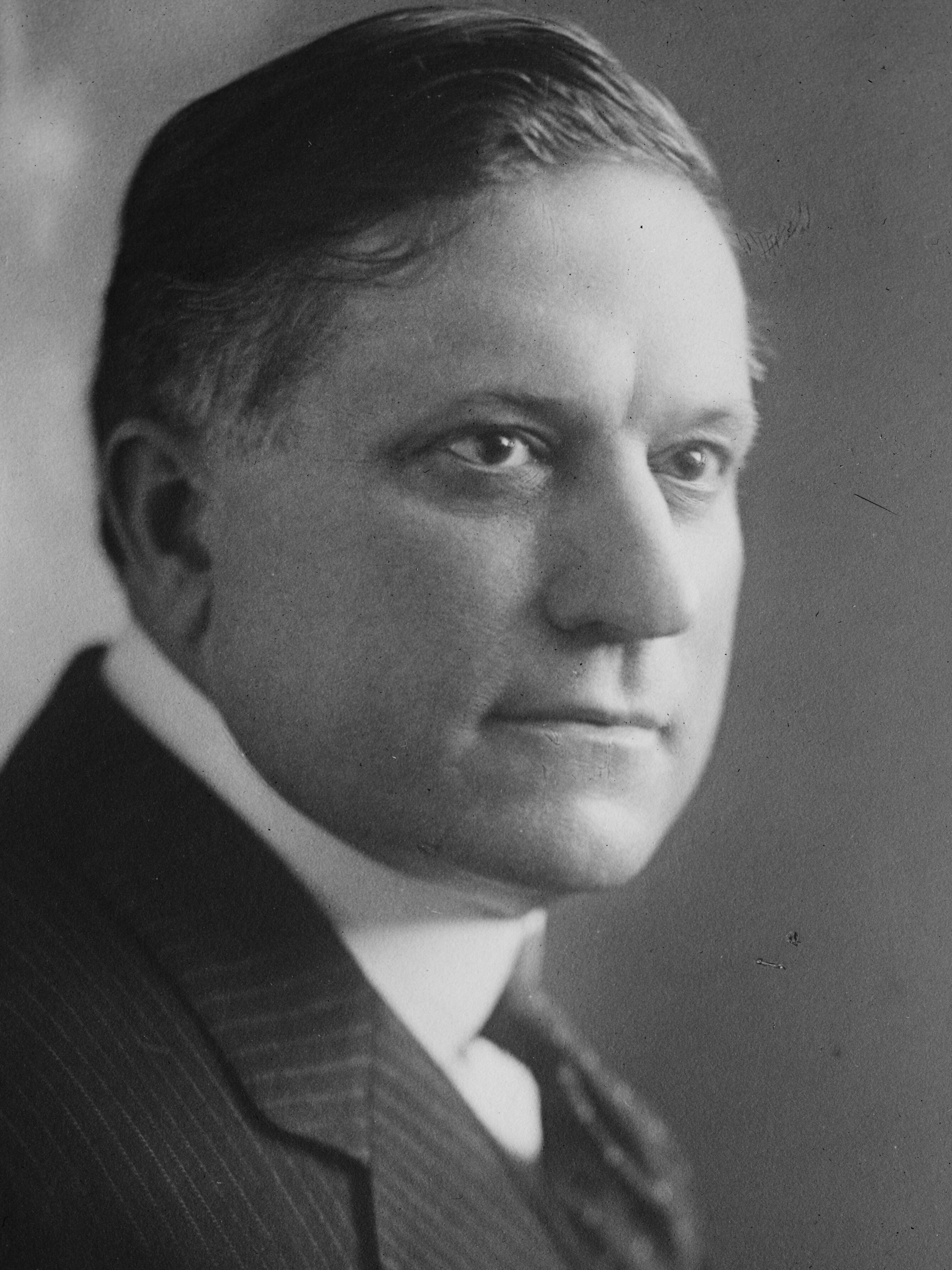

Nominee	Charles A. Templeton	David Fitzgerald
Party	Republican	Democratic
Popular vote	170,231	148,641
Percentage	52.37%	45.73%
- Templeton: 40–50% 50–60% 60–70% 70–80% 80–90% >90% Fitzgerald: 40–50% 50–60% 60–70%
Governor before election
Everett J. Lake
Republican
Elected Governor
Charles A. Templeton
Republican

The 1922 Connecticut gubernatorial election was held on November 7, 1922. Republican nominee Charles A. Templeton defeated Democratic nominee David Fitzgerald with 52.37% of the vote.

== General election ==
=== Candidates ===
Major party candidates

- Charles A. Templeton, Republican
- David Fitzgerald, Democratic

Other candidates

- Martin F. Plunkett, Socialist

=== Results ===
1922 Connecticut gubernatorial election
Party	Candidate	Votes	%	±%
Republican	Charles A. Templeton	170,231	52.37%	
Democratic	David Fitzgerald	148,641	45.73%	
Socialist	Martin F. Plunkett	6,201	1.91%	
Majority		21,590		
Turnout				
Republican hold		Swing		
