= 1924 Connecticut gubernatorial election =

- November 4, 1924
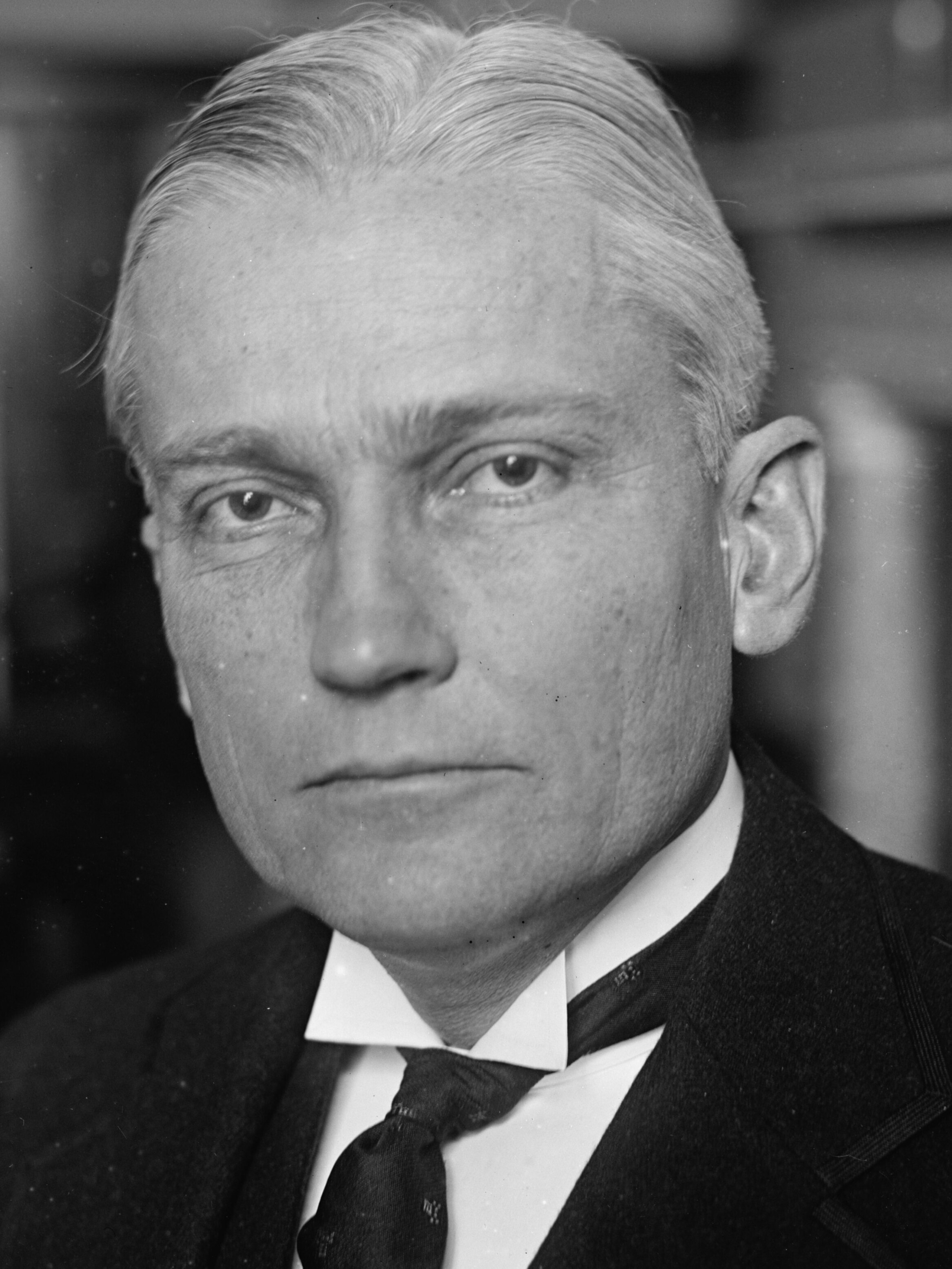

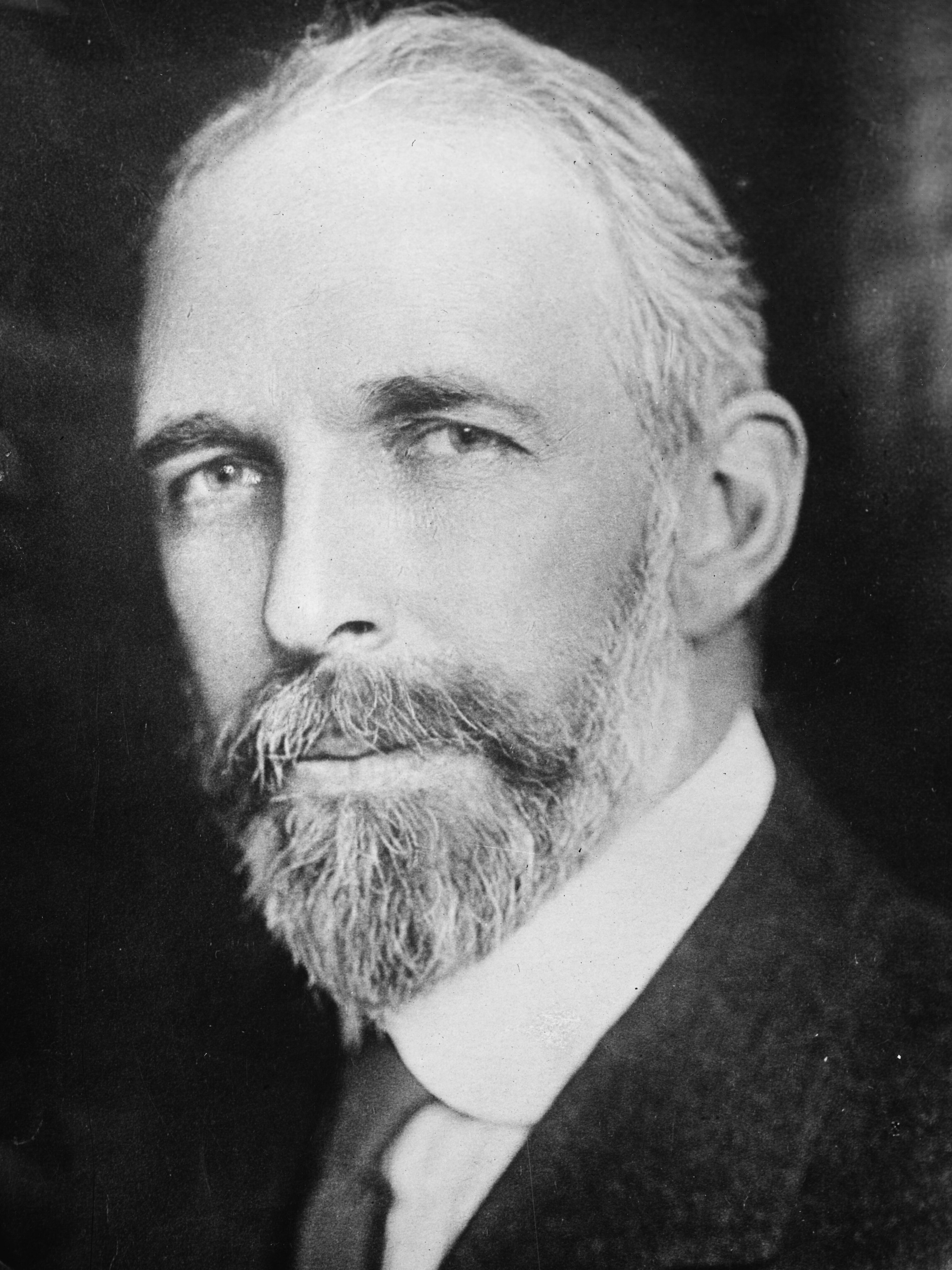
Nominee	Hiram Bingham III	Charles G. Morris
Party	Republican	Democratic
Popular vote	246,336	118,676
Percentage	66.18%	31.88%
- Bingham: 40–50% 50–60% 60–70% 70–80% 80–90% >90% Morris: 50–60%
Governor before election
Charles A. Templeton
Republican
Elected Governor
Hiram Bingham III
Republican

The 1924 Connecticut gubernatorial election was held on November 4, 1924. Republican nominee Hiram Bingham III defeated Democratic nominee Charles G. Morris with 66.18% of the vote.

== General election ==
=== Candidates ===
Major party candidates

- Hiram Bingham III, Republican
- Charles G. Morris, Democratic

Other candidates

- Jasper McLevy, Socialist
- Joseph Mackay, Socialist Labor
- William Mackenzie, Workers

=== Results ===
1924 Connecticut gubernatorial election
Party	Candidate	Votes	%	±%
Republican	Hiram Bingham III	246,336	66.18%	
Democratic	Charles G. Morris	118,676	31.88%	
Socialist	Jasper McLevy	5,168	1.39%	
Socialist Labor	Joseph Mackay	1,313	0.35%	
Workers	William Mackenzie	728	0.20%	
Majority		127,660		
Turnout				
Republican hold		Swing		
