= Hiram Bingham III =

American academic, explorer and politician (1875-1956)

Hiram Bingham
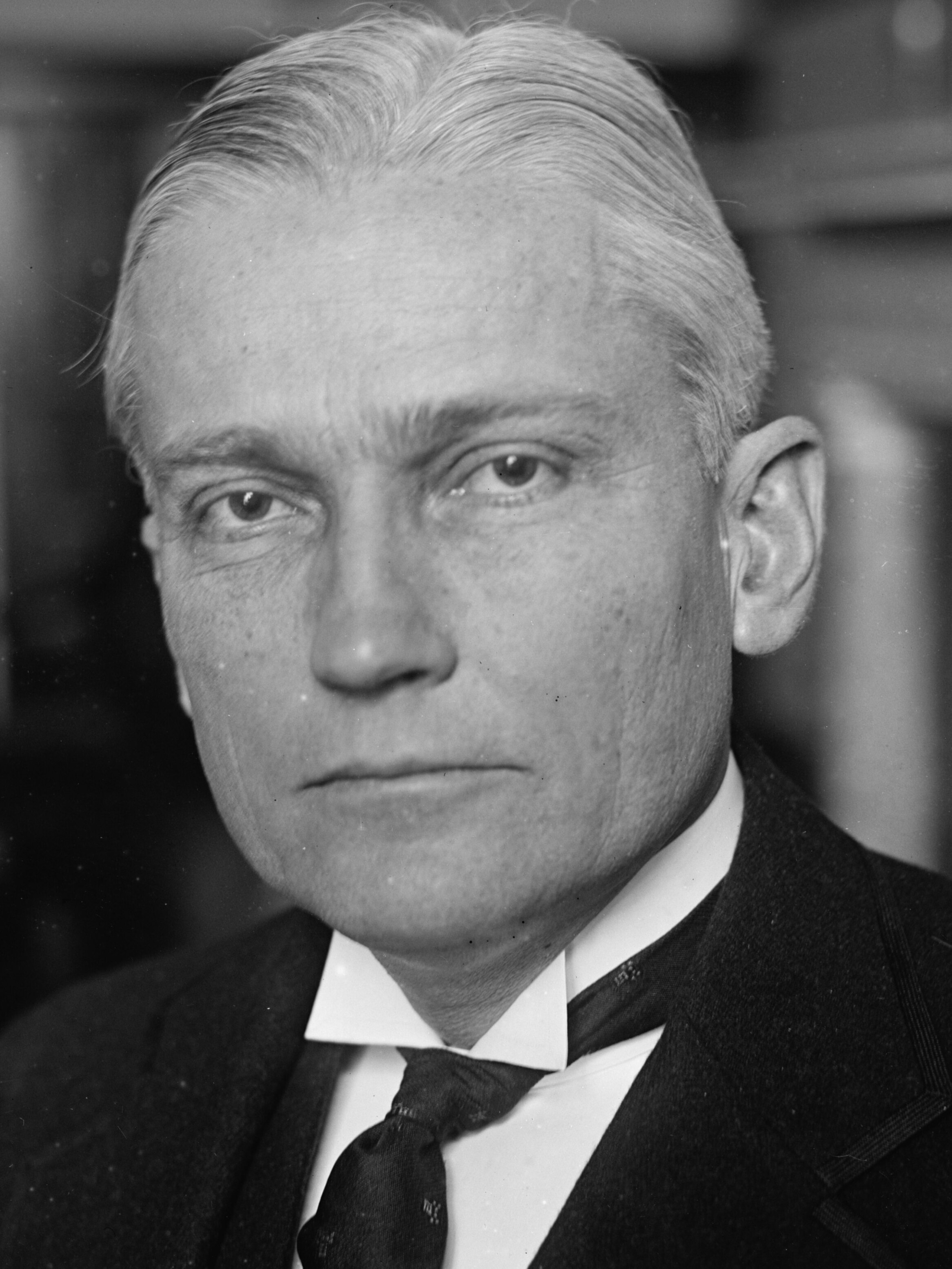
- Bingham in 1925

United States Senator from Connecticut
- In office January 8, 1925 – March 3, 1933
- Preceded by: Frank Bosworth Brandegee
- Succeeded by: Augustine Lonergan

69th Governor of Connecticut
- In office January 7, 1925 – January 8, 1925
- Lieutenant: John H. Trumbull
- Preceded by: Charles A. Templeton
- Succeeded by: John H. Trumbull

78th Lieutenant Governor of Connecticut
- In office January 3, 1923 – January 7, 1925
- Governor: Charles A. Templeton
- Preceded by: Charles A. Templeton
- Succeeded by: John H. Trumbull

Personal details
- Born: November 19, 1875 Honolulu, Hawaii
- Died: June 6, 1956 (aged 80) Washington, D.C., U.S.
- Party: Republican
- Spouse(s): Alfreda Mitchell (divorced); Suzanne Carroll Hill
- Children: 7, including Jonathan and Hiram
- Parent(s): Hiram Bingham II; Clara Brewster
- Education: Yale University (BA); University of California, Berkeley (MA); Harvard University (PhD)

Military service
- Allegiance: United States
- Branch/service: United States Army
- Rank: Captain; Lieutenant Colonel
- Unit: United States National Guard; United States Army Signal Corps Aviation Section; United States Army Air Service
- Battles/wars: World War One

Hiram Bingham III (November 19, 1875 – June 6, 1956) was an American academic, explorer and politician. In 1911, he publicized the existence of the Inca citadel of Machu Picchu which he rediscovered with the guidance of local indigenous farmers. Later, Bingham served as the 69th governor of Connecticut for a single day in 1925—the shortest term in history. He had been elected in 1924 as governor, but was also elected to the Senate and chose that position. He served as a member of the United States Senate until 1933.

== Early life and early academic career ==
Bingham was born in Honolulu, Hawaii, the son of Clara Brewster and Hiram Bingham II (1831–1908), an early Protestant missionary to the Kingdom of Hawai'i. He was also the grandson of Hiram Bingham I (1789–1869) and Sybil Moseley Bingham (1792–1848), earlier missionaries. Through his mother's side he was a descendant of William Brewster, a Mayflower passenger. He attended O'ahu College, now known as Punahou School, from 1882 to 1892.

Bingham went to the United States in his teens in order to undertake higher education, entering Phillips Academy in Andover, Massachusetts, from which he graduated in 1894. He earned a B.A. degree from Yale College in 1898, a degree from the University of California, Berkeley, in 1900, where he took one of the first courses in Latin American history offered in the United States, and a Ph.D. from Harvard University in 1905. Since Harvard at the time did not have a specialist in Latin American history, Edward Gaylord Bourne of Yale served as the examiner for Bingham's qualifying exams. While at Yale, Bingham was a member of Acacia fraternity.

In his first academic position, he taught history and politics at Harvard. He next served as preceptor (teacher) under Woodrow Wilson at Princeton University. Princeton "did not much favor Latin American history." But in 1907, when Yale sought a replacement for Bourne, who had died an early death, it appointed Bingham as a lecturer in South American history. He became one of the pioneers in the U.S. of teaching and research on Latin American history. In 1908, he published an assessment of the field's prospects, "The Possibilities of South American History and Politics as a Field for Research," in which he surveyed library and archival resources in the U.S. as well as in South America. From 1924, he was a member of the Acorn Club.

== Explorer ==
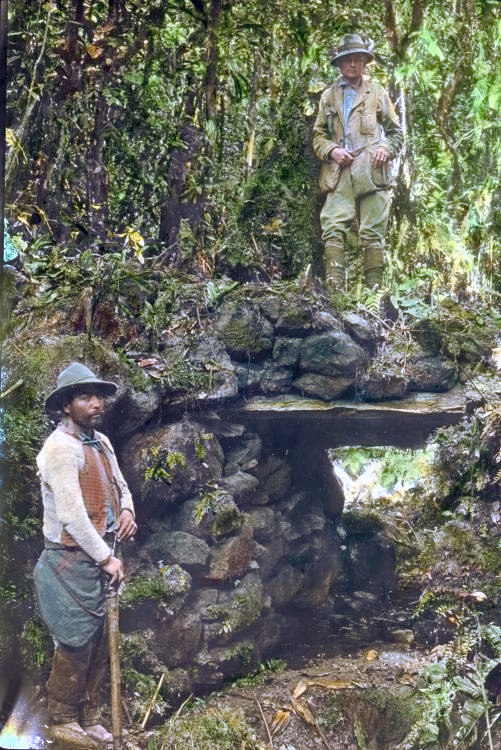
Bingham (upper right) with a local guide on a jungle bridge at Espiritu Pampa in Peru, hand-colored glass slide, 1911

Bingham was not a trained archaeologist. But while he served as a lecturer and professor in South American history at Yale, he journeyed to South America and rediscovered the largely forgotten Inca city of Machu Picchu. In 1908 he had served as a delegate to the First Pan American Scientific Congress at Santiago, Chile. On his way home via Peru, a local prefect convinced him to visit the pre-Columbian city of Choquequirao. Bingham published an account of this trip in Across South America; an account of a journey from Buenos Aires to Lima by way of Potosí, with notes on Brazil, Argentina, Bolivia, Chile, and Peru (1911).

Bingham was thrilled by the prospect of unexplored Inca cities, and organized the 1911 Yale Peruvian Expedition, one of the objectives of which was to search for the last capital of the Incas. Guided by locals, he rediscovered and correctly identified both Vitcos (then called Rosaspata) and Vilcabamba (then called Espíritu Pampa), which he named "Eromboni Pampa". He did not correctly recognize Vilcabamba as the last capital, instead continuing onward and misidentifying Machu Picchu as the "Lost City of the Incas". Decades later, Bingham's oversight was rectified by the Andean explorer Vince Lee, whose detailed research proved that Vilcabamba was indeed the Incas' last capital.

On July 24, 1911, Melchor Arteaga led Bingham to Machu Picchu, which had been largely forgotten by everybody except the small number of people living in the immediately neighboring valley. In addition, Cusco explorers Enrique Palma, Gabino Sanchez, and Agustín Lizárraga are said to have reached the site in 1901. In 1902 Peruvian explorer Agustín Lizárraga led an expedition to the area now known as Machu Picchu. After several hours of clearing undergrowth they reached the stone structures of the citadel, during that visit Lizárraga marked his surname and the year, "A. Lizárraga 1902", in charcoal on the central window of the Temple of the Three Windows. Bingham found the surname of Lizárraga and the 1902 date on the temple. Initially disappointed, he documented in his pocket field journal: "Agustín Lizárraga is discoverer of Machu Picchu and lives at San Miguel Bridge just before passing. However, while Bingham initially acknowledged Lizárraga as the discoverer in his early writings and speeches, including Inca Land (1922), he gradually downplayed Lizárraga's role until, in his final version of the story, Lost City of the Incas (1952), Bingham claimed to have found the site himself. Two local missionaries, Thomas Payne and Stuart McNairn, are credited by descendants with having climbed to the ruins in 1906.

Bingham returned to Peru in 1912, 1914, and 1915 with the support of Yale and the National Geographic Society. In Lost City of the Incas (1948), Bingham related how he came to believe that Machu Picchu housed a major religious shrine and served as a training center for religious leaders. Modern archaeological research has since determined that the site was not a religious center but a royal estate to which Inca leaders and their entourage repaired during the Andean summer.

A key element of the expeditions' legacy are the collections of exotic animals, antiquities, and human skeletal remains. These objects introduced the modern world to a new view of ancient Peru and allowed 20th-century interpreters to interpret Machu Picchu as a "lost city" that Bingham "scientifically discovered". Bingham merged his reliance on prospecting by local huaqueros with the notion that science had a sovereign claim on all artifacts that might contribute to the accumulation of knowledge.

Machu Picchu has become one of the major tourist attractions in South America. Bingham is recognized as the man who brought the site to world attention, although many others helped. The switchback-filled road that carries tourist buses to the site from the Urubamba River is called Carretera Hiram Bingham (the Hiram Bingham Highway).

Bingham's book Lost City of the Incas became a bestseller upon its publication in 1948.

Bingham has been cited as a possible inspiration for the film character Harry Steele, played by Charlton Heston in the 1954 film Secret of the Incas, which is about a fictional archaeological dig at Machu Picchu, and shot on location. The Steele character, and some scenarios in that film, subsequently inspired the film character Indiana Jones, and the 'Map room' scenario in Raiders of the Lost Ark.

Peru has long sought the return of the estimated 40,000 artifacts, including mummies, ceramics, and bones, that Bingham excavated and exported from Machu Picchu. He had been given permission through a decree by the Peruvian government. Peru had since argued that the objects were only loaned to Yale, not given. On September 14, 2007, an agreement was made between Yale University and the Peruvian government for the objects' return. On April 12, 2008, the Peruvian government said it had revised previous estimates of 4,000 pieces up to 40,000. In 2012 Yale University began returning thousands of these objects to Peru.

Bingham was a member of The Explorers Club.

== Prior discoverers of Machu Picchu ==
An 1874 map shows the site of Machu Picchu. Soon after Bingham announced the existence of Machu Picchu, others came forward claiming to have seen the city first, such as British missionary Thomas Payne and German engineer named J. M. von Hassel. Recent discoveries have put forth a new claimant, a German named Augusto Berns who bought land opposite the Machu Picchu mountain in the 1860s and tried to raise money from investors to plunder nearby Incan ruins.

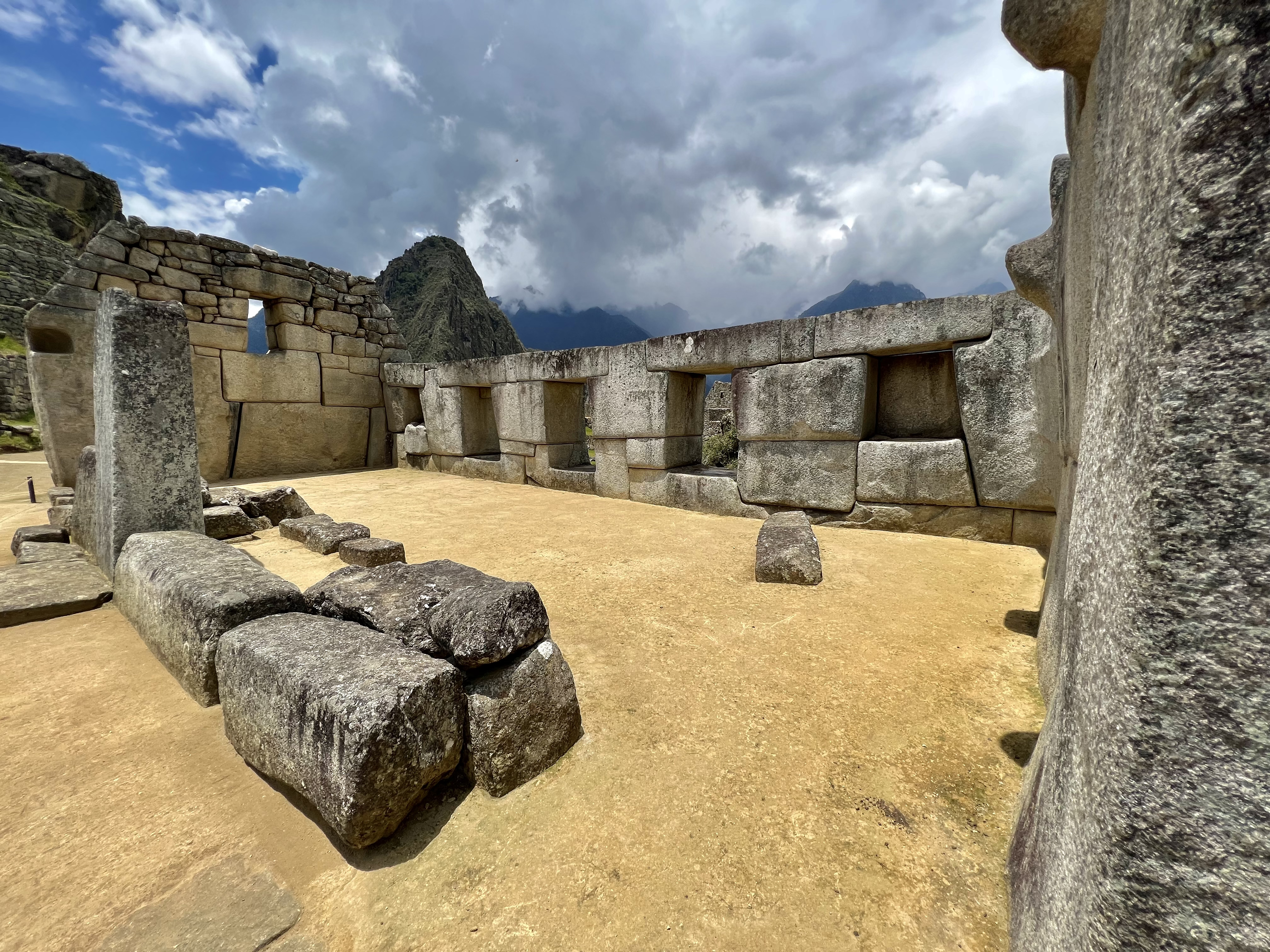
Temple of the Three Windows, once featuring the inscription "A. Lizárraga 1902" left by Lizárraga, later erased by Bingham

In 1911, Bingham found the name Agustín Lizárraga and the date 1902 written in charcoal on one of the walls of the Temple of the Three Windows. Initially disappointed, he documented in his journal: "Agustín Lizárraga is discoverer of Machu Picchu and lives at San Miguel Bridge just before passing".

Prior to the 19th and 20th centuries at least one conquistador, Baltasar de Ocampo, was known to have visited the site in the late 16th century. Ocampo left detailed notes on the richly carved and finely dressed stone lintels, among other notable features of the mountaintop palace.

== Marriage and family ==
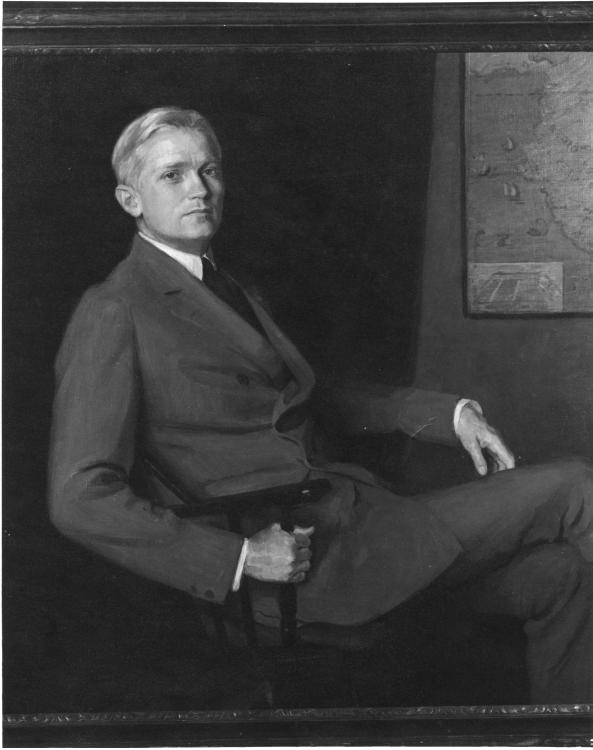
Hiram Bingham painted by Mary Foote, sister of Harry Ward Foote, the Yale chemistry professor who was Bingham's companion on his trips to Peru

Bingham married Alfreda Mitchell, granddaughter of Charles L. Tiffany and his wife, on November 20, 1900. They had seven sons together: Woodbridge (1901–1986) (professor), Hiram Bingham IV (1903–1988) (diplomat and World War II hero), Alfred Mitchell Bingham (1905–1998) (lawyer and author), Charles Tiffany (1906–1993) (physician), Brewster (1908–1995) (minister), Mitchell (1910–1994) (artist), and Jonathan Brewster Bingham (1914–1986) (Democratic Congressman).

After a divorce he married Suzanne Carroll Hill in June 1937. His former wife, Alfreda Mitchell, married pianist Henry Gregor in August 1937.

In 1982 Temple University Press published Char Miller's doctoral dissertation on the Bingham family titled Fathers and sons: The Bingham family and the American mission.

== Military ==
Bingham achieved the rank of captain of the Connecticut National Guard in 1916. In 1917, he became an aviator and organized the United States Schools of Military Aeronautics at eight universities to provide ground school training for aviation cadets. He served the Aviation Section, U.S. Signal Corps and the Air Service, attaining the rank of lieutenant colonel. In Issoudun, France, Bingham commanded the Third Aviation Instruction Center, the Air Service's largest primary instruction and pursuit training school. He became a supporter of the Air Service in their post-war quest for independence from the Army and supported that effort, in part, with the publication of his wartime experiences titled, An Explorer in the Air Service published in 1920 by Yale University Press.

== Politics ==
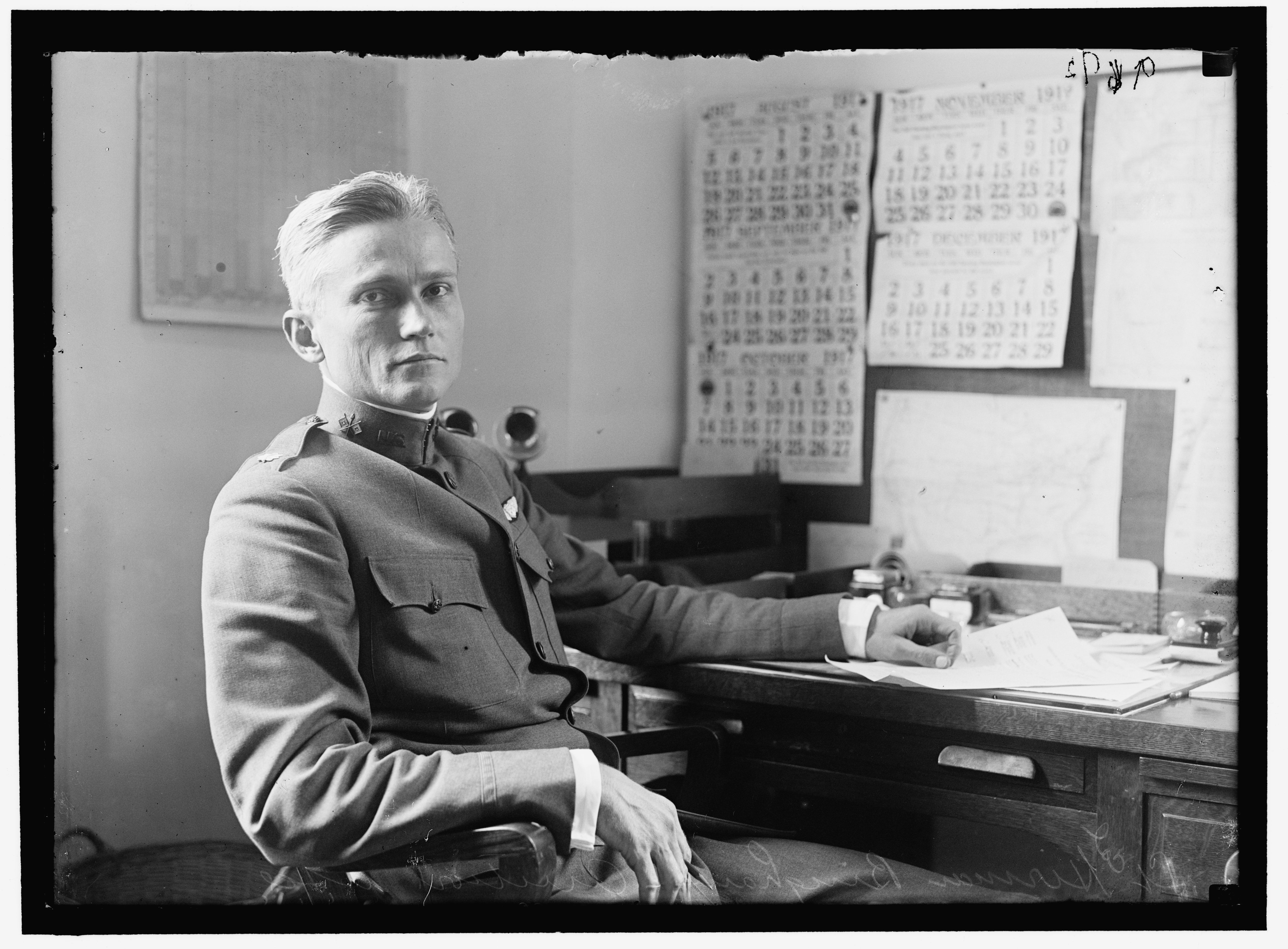
Hiram Bingham III at his desk in 1917

In 1922, Bingham was elected lieutenant governor of Connecticut, an office he held until 1924. In November 1924, he was elected governor.

On December 16, 1924, Bingham was also elected as a Republican to serve in the United States Senate to fill a vacancy created by the suicide of Frank Bosworth Brandegee. Bingham defeated noted educator Hamilton Holt by a handy margin. Now both governor-elect and senator-elect, Bingham served as governor for one day (January 7–8, 1925), the shortest term of any Connecticut governor, before resigning to take his Senate seat.

Bingham was reelected to a full six-year Senate term in 1926.

He was Chairman of the Committee on Printing and then Chairman of the Committee on Territories and Insular Possessions. President Calvin Coolidge appointed Bingham to the President's Aircraft Board during his first term in the Senate; the press quickly dubbed the ex-explorer "The Flying Senator".

Bingham failed in his second reelection effort in the wake of the 1932 Democratic landslide following the start of the Great Depression. He left the Senate at the end of his second term in 1933.

During World War II, Bingham lectured at several United States Navy training schools. In 1951 he was appointed Chairman of the Civil Service Commission Loyalty Review Board, an assignment he kept through 1953.

=== Censure in the Senate ===
The Senate Judiciary Subcommittee investigated an arrangement between Bingham, his clerk, and a lobbyist who agreed to pass information on to Bingham's office after executing a plan that was irregular "even by the standards of his day." Bingham took his clerk off duty, and paid his salary to the lobbyist, thus allowing him to attend as a Senate staffer to closed meetings of the Finance Committee's deliberations on tariff legislation.

The Judiciary Subcommittee initially condemned Bingham's scheme but recommended no formal Senate action. Subsequently, Bingham decided to label the subcommittee's inquiry a partisan witch hunt, provoking further Senate interest. Eventually the Senate passed a resolution of censure on November 4, 1929, by a vote of 54 to 22.

== Death ==
On June 6, 1956, Bingham died at his Washington, D.C., home. He is interred at Arlington National Cemetery in Virginia.

== See also ==
- Eternity in their Hearts by Don Richardson, Regal Books, Ventura, CA, 1981. ISBN 0-8307-0925-8, pp. 34–35
- List of federal political scandals in the United States
- List of United States senators expelled or censured

Political offices
Preceded by Charles A. Templeton	Lieutenant Governor of Connecticut; 1923–1925	Succeeded by John H. Trumbull
Preceded by Charles A. Templeton	Governor of Connecticut; 1925	Succeeded by John H. Trumbull
Party political offices
Preceded by Charles A. Templeton	Republican nominee for Governor of Connecticut; 1924	Succeeded by John H. Trumbull
Preceded by Frank Bosworth Brandegee	Republican nominee for U.S. Senator from Connecticut (Class 3); 1924, 1926, 1932	Succeeded by John A. Danaher
U.S. Senate
Preceded by Frank Bosworth Brandegee	U.S. Senator (Class 3) from Connecticut; 1925–1933; Served alongside: Frederic Walcott	Succeeded by Augustine Lonergan
