= Edwin Lincoln Moseley =

American naturalist (1865–1948)

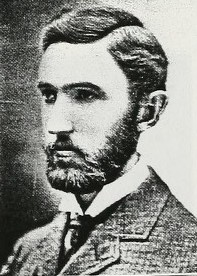
- Photograph of Edwin Lincoln Moseley from the 1918 "BeeGee"
- Born: March 29, 1865; Union City, Michigan, US
- Died: June 6, 1948 (aged 92); Johnston Hospital, Bowling Green State University, Bowling Green, Ohio, US
- Resting place: Oak Grove Cemetery, Bowling Green, Ohio
- Citizenship: American
- Education: University of Michigan, Master of Arts 1885
- Known for: Study of Milk sickness, Writings on the 90.4 year tree ring cycle.
- Awards: Fellow of the American Association for the Advancement of Science, 1902
- Scientific career
- Fields: Astronomy, Botany, Climatology, Dendrology, Geology, Zoology
- Workplaces: Sandusky High School, Bowling Green State University

Edwin Lincoln Moseley (March 29, 1865 – June 6, 1948) was an American naturalist, known for his work covering milk sickness and dendrochronology.

== Biography ==
=== Early life and education ===
Moseley was born in 1865 in Union City Michigan, to a prohibitionist father, and a mother who was one of the first white children born on Hawaii. He was the maternal grandson of Hiram Bingham I and Sybil Moseley Bingham, and a descendant of Myles Standish.

He attended Union City High School, graduating in 1880, and attending a year of post graduation studies there before he was admitted to the University of Michigan, where he earned his masters of Arts in 1885. He paid for his education mostly through his own work, with the exception of $150 he was gifted from family.

=== Career ===
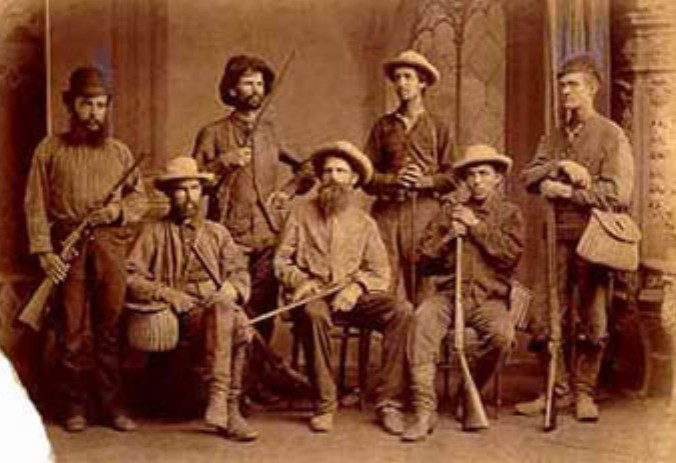
Members of Joseph Steere's 1887 Scientific Expedition

From 1885 to 1887 Moseley taught in Grand Rapids, Michigan.

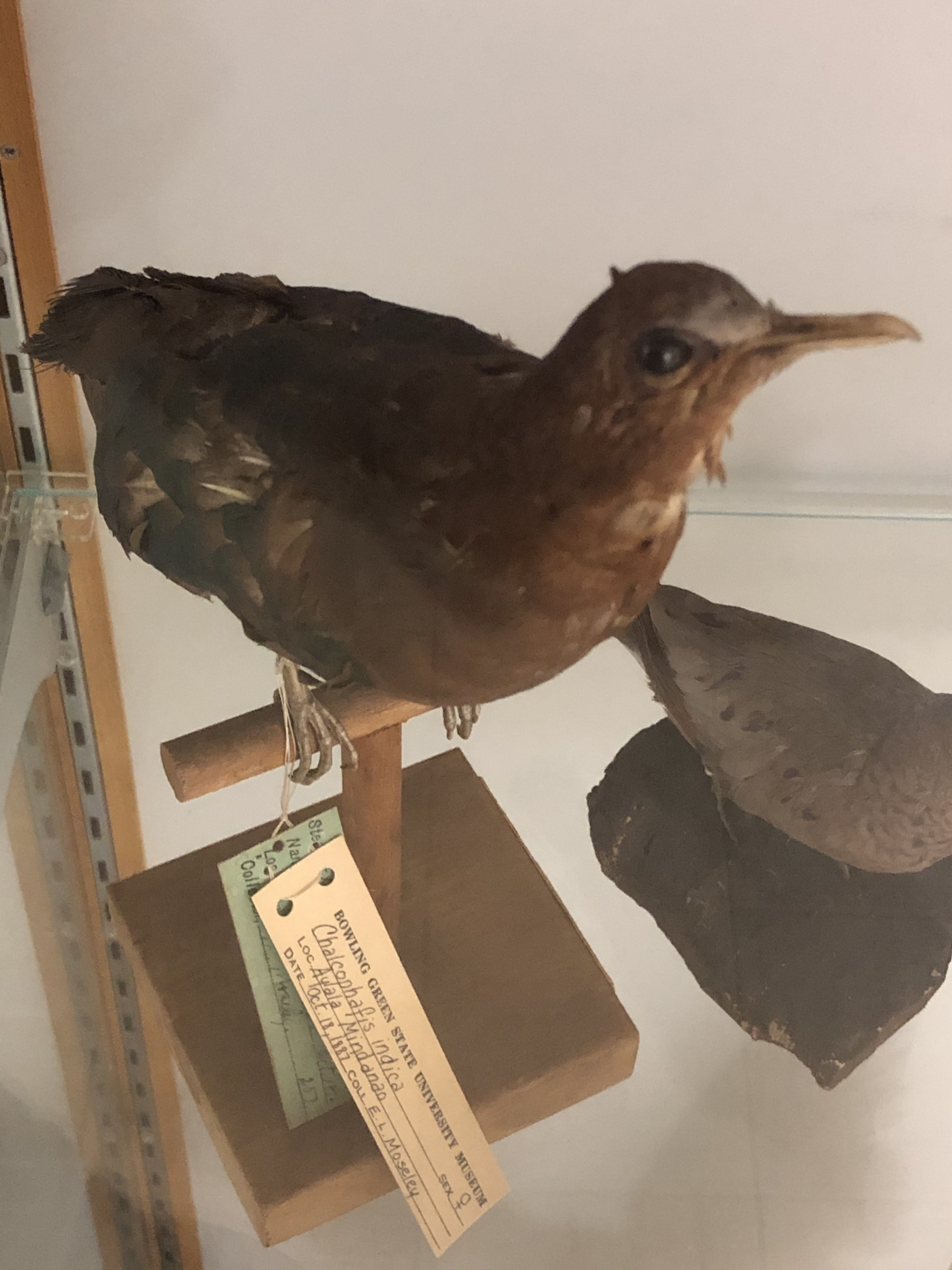
A Female Chalcophaps indica collected by Moseley in 1887.

Edwin Moseley was among the members of Joseph Steere's 1887 Scientific Expedition to areas in the Philippines, Hawaii, Japan, and China.

Moseley became a teacher at Sandusky High School in Sandusky, Ohio in 1889, where following a tour of European museums in 1890, he founded a natural history museum at the school in January 1891.

Between 1901 and 1904 he and 100 of his students surveyed the Sandusky Bay by probing the bed with Augers during the winter, and recording the amount of glacial till unearthed.

In 1905 Mosley conducted experiments on school animals including cats, a dog, rabbits, and sheep by feeding them food including Eupatorium rugosum then published and disseminated how it caused milk sickness in a formal paper presented to the Ohio Academy of Sciences that year, with his work in this area being valued by Charles C. Deam. A 1919 article in The Journal of Infectious Diseases identified this as the first organized systematic experiment conducted on the issue.

In 1914 Moseley became one of the first faculty at Bowling Green Normal College, where he served as head of the Biology Department until retirement in 1936.

During his retirement Moseley wrote about a link between solar events and dendrochronology. His work in weather forecasting was recognized by The New York Times.

The 1940s saw Mosley pursue research into solar phenomenon and how it affected natural systems, as in 1941 Moseley published "Sun-spots and Tree Rings" and in October 1942 when Mosley published "Solar Influence on Variations in Rainfall in the Interior of the United States".

In 1943 Mosley was awarded a Doctorate of Humane Letters by Bowling Green State University.

On April 28, 1948, in Dayton, Ohio, Moseley became ill; later dying on June 6, 1948, to coronary thrombosis. His will dedicated his estate, worth between $50,000 and $100,000 at the time of death, to create scholarships for students.

== Publications ==
Moseley wrote Trees, Stars, and Birds, which was published in 1920 and featured illustrations by Louis Agassiz Fuertes.

Moseley wrote Other Worlds, a book on Astronomy published by The Appleton Century Company. The book was praised in a 1933 review published by the New York Times for its clear presentation of subject matter. The book was criticized by James Stokley in The Journal of the Franklin Institute for containing a number of inaccuracies known at the time. The book grew out of an earlier article published in Scientific American, which speculated on the possibility of extraterrestrial life.

== Personal life ==
Moseley abstained from a number of substances, believing alcohol, tobacco, caffeine, and opium to be particularly harmful. He also publicly admonished students working in chemistry labs for gaining a chloroform habit.

Moseley had a number of frugal habits, such as making tomato soup from ketchup and hot water. He was known to avoid buying new clothes, and frequently wore a single blue suit made of serge that had received so much wear the fabric had become shiny.

During World War II, Moseley served as a local representative of the Russian War Relief agency in Bowling Green, Ohio, and solicited donations for Russian war refugees.

Moseley promoted the conservation of barn owls.
