= June Bingham Birge =

American dramatist

- Born: June Rossbach; June 20, 1919; White Plains, New York, US
- Died: August 21, 2007 (aged 88); New York City, US
- Education: B.A. Barnard College
- Spouses: Jonathan Brewster Bingham (until his death); Robert Bowen Birge
- Children: 4
- Family: Mayer Lehman (great-grandfather)

June Bingham Birge (June 20, 1919 – August 21, 2007) was an author, playwright, and member of the Lehman family.

== Biography ==
Born as June Rossbach in White Plains, New York. She was the daughter of Mabel Limburg and Max J.H. Rossbach. She was the grand niece of New York Governor Herbert H. Lehman, for whom the Lehman College is named. Her maternal grandmother was Clara Lehman Limburg, and her great-grandfather was Mayer Lehman, one of the founders of the Lehman Brothers firm. She earned a bachelor's degree in English from Barnard College in 1940. Birge wrote several non-fiction books, including Courage to Change: An Introduction to the Life and Thought of Reinhold Niebuhr (Scribner, 1961); U Thant: The Search for Peace (Knopf, 1966); and, with Norman Tamarkin, The Pursuit of Health (Walker, 1985). Her plays included a musical, Asylum: The Strange Case of Mary Lincoln, and a play about the women around Franklin D. Roosevelt, Triangles.

== Personal life and death ==
In 1939, she married Jonathan Brewster Bingham, who served in Congress from 1965 to 1983 as a Democrat representing The Bronx; he died in 1986. They had four children: Sherrell Bingham Downes; Timothy Woodbridge Bingham; Claudia Bingham Meyers; and June Mitchell (Micki) Esselstyn (d. 1999). In 1987, she married Robert Bowen Birge.

June Bingham Birge died at her home in Riverdale, The Bronx, aged 88, from cancer.
