= Augusto Berns =

German engineer and entrepreneur who rediscovered Machu Pichu in 1867

- Born: Rudolph August Berns; June 8, 1842
- Died: 1888
- Occupations: Engineer and entrepreneur

Augusto Berns, originally Rudolph August Berns (born June 8, 1842, in Uerdingen; died after 1888), was a German engineer and entrepreneur. In 1867 he visited the abandoned Inca city of Machu Picchu in the Peruvian Andes, which nowadays is designated as a UNESCO World Heritage Site and counted among the New Seven Wonders of the World.

== Biography ==
Rudolph August Berns was the eldest son of wine merchant Johann Berns and his wife Amalie Caroline Albertine Berns, née Dültgen. The family later lived in Friedrichswerder (a neighborhood of Berlin), where the father worked as a wine merchant. As a young man Berns emigrated to Peru, thereafter calling himself Augusto Berns. In 1866 he worked as a cannon operator in the defense of the port city of Callao against the Spaniards, and later as a land surveyor for a railway company.

== Machu Picchu ==
Hiram Bingham was considered the discoverer of Machu Picchu for a long time. Only recently have researchers become convinced that Berns discovered the city before Bingham. The evidence comes from a book written by the cartographer Hermann Göhring, representative of the Leipzig Museum of Ethnology in Guayaquil from 1880. In 1873, together with the prefect of Cusco, Baltazar La Torre, he traveled through, described, and mapped the Peruvian province of Paucartambo. In his expedition report published in 1877 Hermann Göhring mentions the "fortress" Picchu. The book also includes a map drawn in 1874 that shows Machu Picchu. According to documents in the Biblioteca Nacional del Perú in Lima Berns had rediscovered the city.

The American historian Paolo Greer, who had found the documents concerning Augusto Berns in the Peruvian National Library, initially suspected that Berns had plundered the Inca city. He later abandoned this theory. Berns may not have been the only one to discover the city before Bingham, but research on this matter is not yet complete.

Further details about the fate of Augusto Berns, particularly his business ventures, can be found in a biography in the Peruvian National Library, which extends up to the year 1887. After that, his trail is lost.

It is said that after the discovery of Machu Picchu, Berns came up with the joint-stock company Huaca del Inca for the recovery of the gold and silver treasures of the ancient culture; he collected the shareholders' money and disappeared with it.

== Legacy ==
The writer Sabrina Janesch recounts the life story of Augusto Berns in her 2017 novel Die goldene Stadt (The Golden City), which is based on her own research as well as that of historians.
