= Hiram Bingham I =

American Protestant missionary

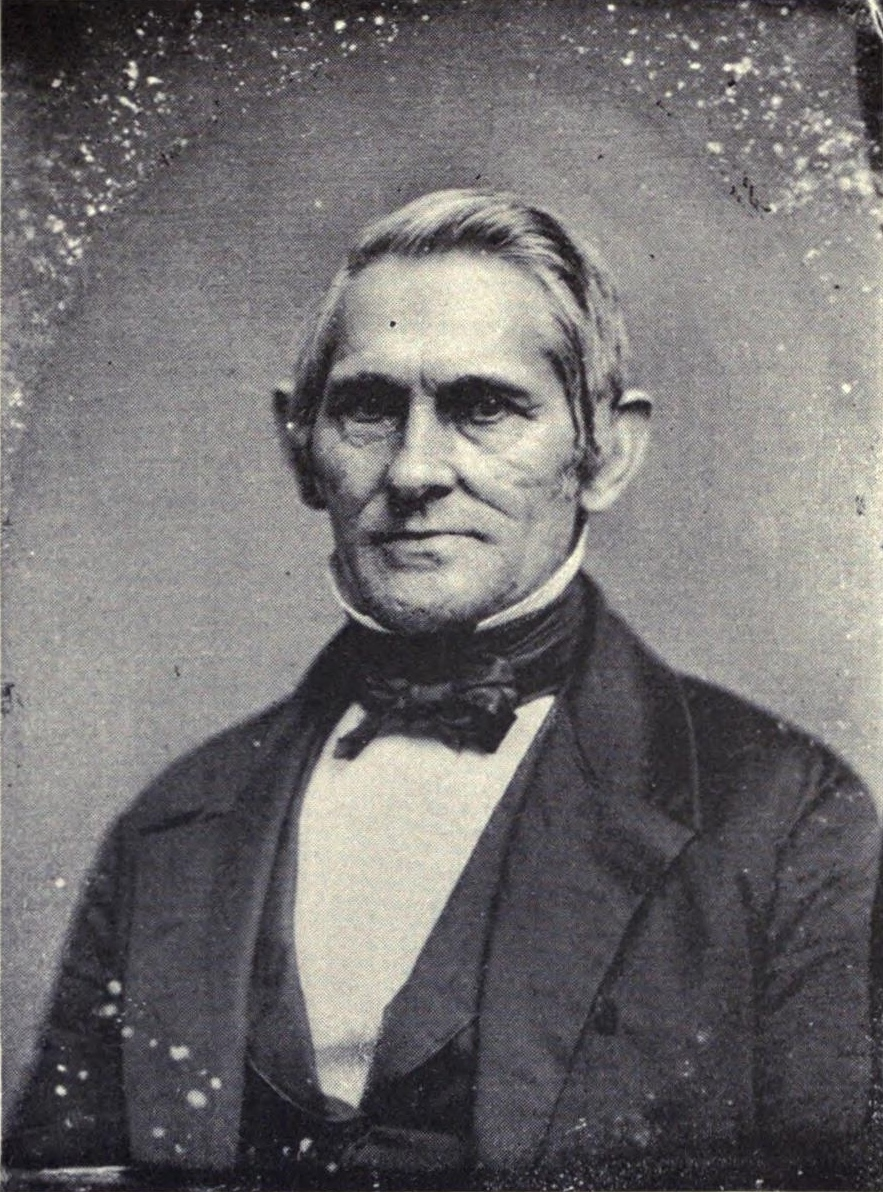
- Bingham in 1852
- Born: October 30, 1789; Bennington, Vermont Republic
- Died: November 11, 1869 (aged 80); New Haven, Connecticut, USA
- Education: Middlebury College
- Occupations: Missionary, writer, translator, royal advisor
- Known for: converting the Kingdom of Hawaii to Christianity and serving as Kawaiahaʻo Church's first pastor
- Spouses: Sybil Moseley; Naomi E. Morse
- Children: Hiram Bingham II, and six others
- Parent(s): Calvin and Lydia Bingham

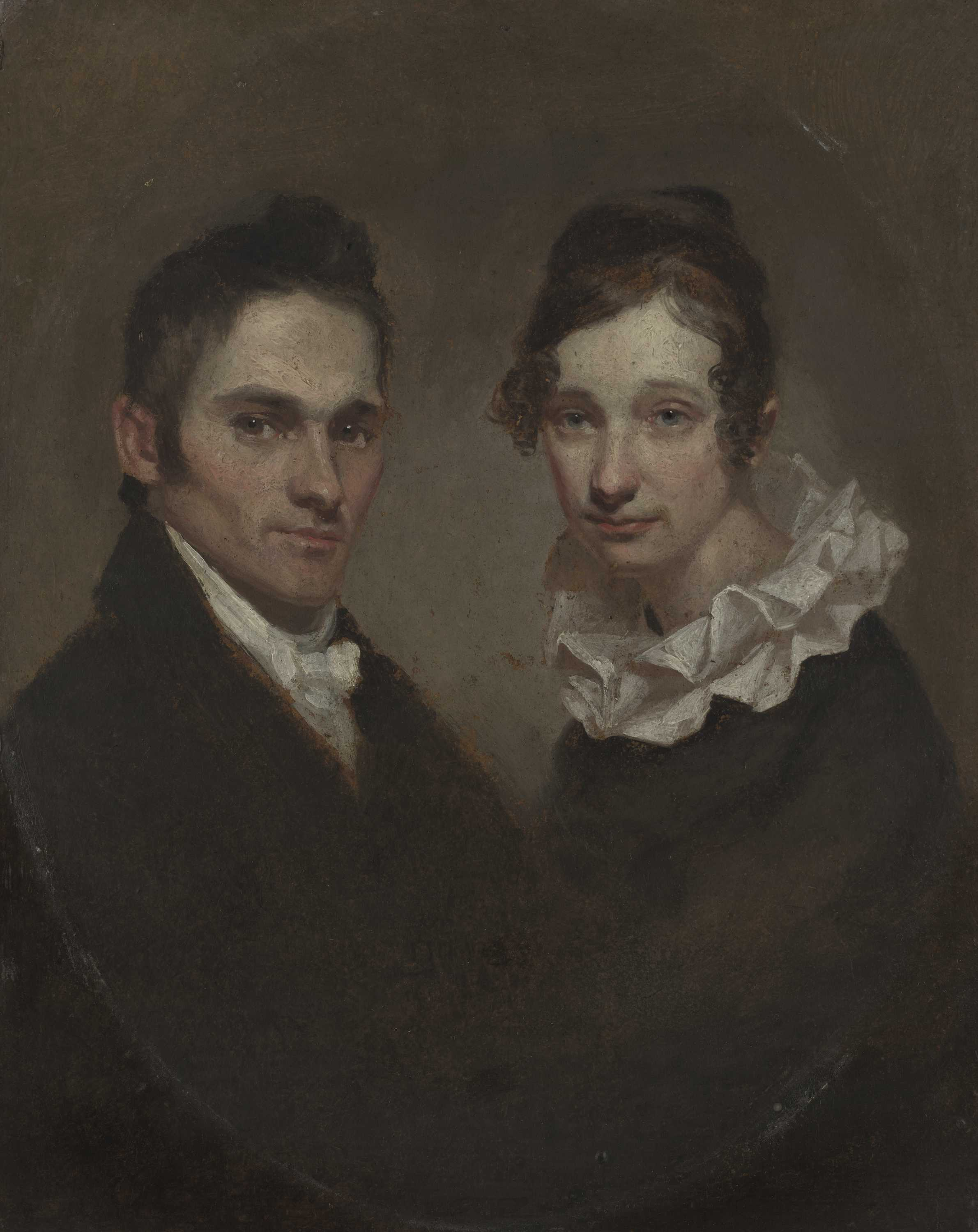
Portrait of Hiram and Sybil Moseley Bingham, by Samuel Morse, 1819

Hiram Bingham, formally Hiram Bingham I (October 30, 1789 – November 11, 1869), was the leader of the first group of American Protestant missionaries to introduce Christianity to the Hawaiian Islands. Like most of the missionaries, he was a Congregationalist minister from New England.

== Life ==
Bingham was descended from Deacon Thomas Bingham, who emigrated to the American colonies in 1650 and settled in Connecticut Colony. He was born October 30, 1789, in Bennington, Vermont, one of thirteen children of his mother, Lydia, and father, Calvin Bingham. He attended Middlebury College and the Andover Theological Seminary. He had as private tutor Rev. Elisha Yale, who taught him Greek and Latin and prepared him for higher education.

After breaking his first engagement Bingham found a new bride, Sybil Moseley. He needed to be married to be accepted as a missionary. On October 23, 1819, the young couple sailed out of Boston aboard the brig Thaddeus along with Asa and Lucy Goodale Thurston to lead a mission in the Sandwich Islands (Hawaii) for the American Board of Commissioners for Foreign Missions.

== Hawaii ==
Bingham and his wife arrived first on the island of Hawaii in 1820, and sailed on to Honolulu on Oʻahu on April 19. In 1823, Queen Kaʻahumanu and six high chiefs requested baptism. Soon after, the Hawaiian government banned prostitution and drunkenness, which resulted in the shipping industry and the foreign community resenting Bingham's influence. Bingham wrote extensively about the natives and was critical of their land-holding regime and of their "state of civilization". He supported the introduction of market values along with Christianity: historians now reference his writings to illustrate the imperial values that were central to the attitudes of the United States towards Hawaii. Bingham became involved in the development of the spelling system for writing the Hawaiian language, and also translated parts of the Bible into Hawaiian.

Bingham designed the Kawaiahaʻo Church in Honolulu on the Hawaiian Island of Oahu. The building, constructed between 1836 and 1842 in the New England style typical of the Hawaiian missionaries, is one of the oldest standing Christian places of worship in Hawaii.

Bingham used his influence with Queen Kaʻahumanu to instigate a strongly anti-Catholic policy in Hawaii, considerably impeding the work of the French Catholic missionary Alexis Bachelot (1796–1837) and resulting in decades of persecution of those Hawaiians who converted to Catholicism. This was motivated by opposition to the spread of French influence in Hawaii as well as by the religious Protestant-Catholic rivalry and enmity.

== Legacy and honors ==
- A math building in Punahou School is named after Bingham.
- Bingham Tract School was an academically rigorous elementary school, named after him, and operated on the Bingham lands until the mid-1990s.

== Return ==
The board grew concerned that Bingham was interfering too often in Hawaiian politics and recalled him. The Binghams left on August 3, 1840 and reached New England on February 4, 1841. It was intended to be a sabbatical owing to Sybil's poor health, but the board refused to reappoint Bingham as a missionary, even after Sybil's death on February 27, 1848. He published a memoir, A Residence of Twenty-One Years in the Sandwich Islands, in 1847.

Bingham remained in New England, where he served as the pastor of an African-American church. In 1852 he remarried, to Naomi Morse, who ran a girls' school. He died on November 11, 1869, and was buried at Grove Street Cemetery, in New Haven, Connecticut. Leonard Bacon gave the address at his funeral.

== Hawaiian Bible and hymns ==
Bingham was the leader of a group of missionaries that included Asa Thurston and Artemas Bishop and they translated the Christian Bible into the Hawaiian language. The New Testament was published in 1832 and the Old Testament in 1839. The entire NT/OT Bible was revised in 1868 and was republished as Ka Baibala Hemolele (The Holy Bible) in 2018 in print and electronic forms.

Binamu (Bingham's Hawaiian name) also composed Hawaiian hymns such as ‘Himeni Hope’ (closing hymn), starting with "Ho'omaika'i i ka Makua Ke Akua o kakou, ...", meaning ‘Blessings to the Father, the God of us all, ...’, which were typically quiet and reflective but powerful. His hymns are still sung in Hawaii at the churches and by the choruses in concert.

== Legacy ==
Bingham's son, Hiram Bingham II, was also a missionary to the Kingdom of Hawaiʻi. His daughter Lydia married the later Hawaiian missionary Titus Coan.

His grandson Hiram Bingham III was an explorer who brought Machu Picchu to the attention of the west and became a US Senator and Governor of Connecticut. Another grandson, Edwin Lincoln Moseley, was a naturalist.

His great-grandson Hiram Bingham IV was the US Vice Consul in Marseille, France, during World War II and gave American visas to thousands of refugees, mostly Jews, fleeing Nazi Germany. Another great-grandson, Jonathan Brewster Bingham, was a long-time Reform Democratic Congressman from The Bronx from the mid-1960s through the early 1980s.

In World War II, the United States Liberty ship SS Hiram Bingham was named in his honor. It was hull number 1726.

Bingham was caricatured as the character Reverend Abner Hale in James Michener's novel Hawaii.

== See also ==
- Bible translations into Hawaiian
