= 1926 United States Senate election in Connecticut =

- November 2, 1926
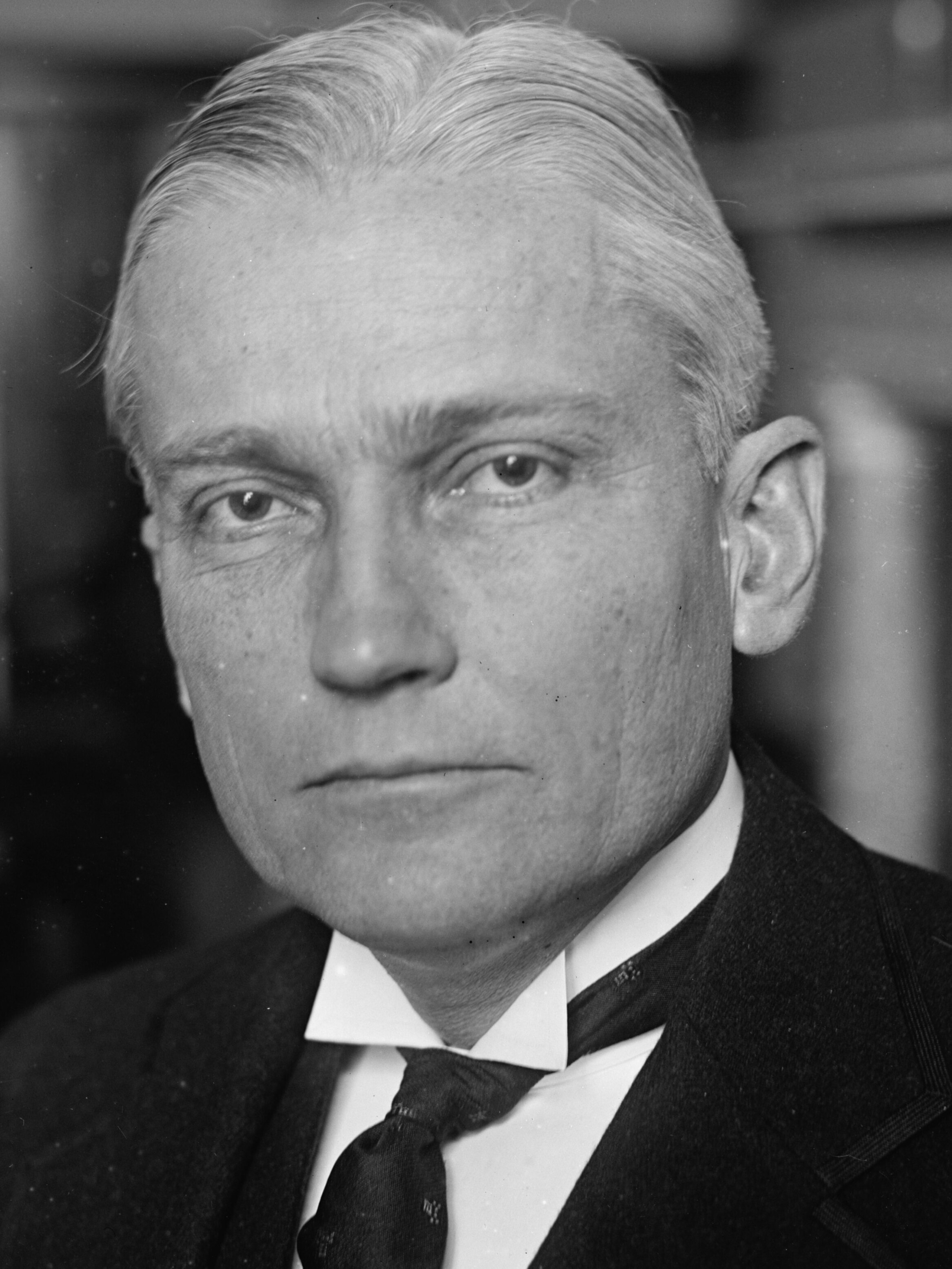

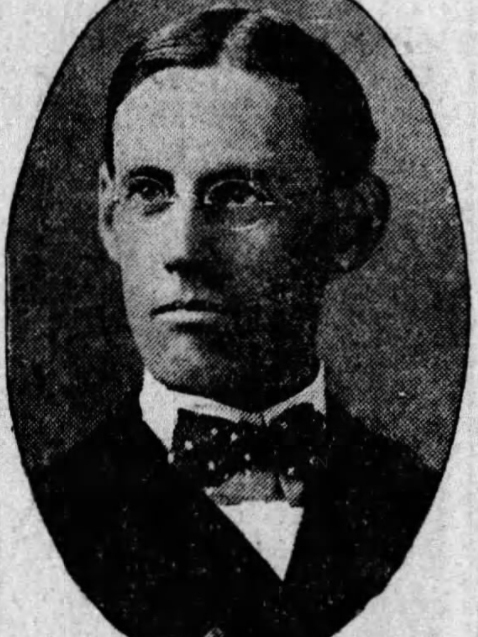
Nominee	Hiram Bingham III	Rollin Tyler
Party	Republican	Democratic
Popular vote	191,401	107,753
Percentage	63.31%	35.64%
- Bingham: 50–60% 60–70% 70–80% 80–90% 90–100% Tyler: 50–60% Tie: 50% No votes
U.S. senator before election
Hiram Bingham III
Republican
Elected U.S. Senator
Hiram Bingham III
Republican

The 1926 United States Senate election in Connecticut was held on November 2, 1926.

Incumbent Senator Hiram Bingham III, who won a 1924 special election to complete the unexpired term of Frank B. Brandegee, was re-elected to a full term in office over Democrat Rollin U. Tyler.

== Republican nomination ==
At the Republican convention in Hartford on September 13, Senator Bingham was unopposed for re-nomination.

== Democratic nomination ==
=== Candidates ===
- Rollin Tyler, Probate Court Judge and nominee for governor in 1920

==== Declined ====
- Charles Gould Morris, nominee for governor in 1924 (ran for governor)
- William E. Thoms, judge and former mayor of Waterbury

=== Campaign ===
The Senate nomination was largely seen as a secondary consolation prize in the campaign for governor. The two leading candidates for that office were Charles Gould Morris and William E. Thoms. On the eve of the convention, Thoms appeared to have the edge for governor, leaving the Senate nomination to Morris.

=== Convention ===
At the convention, Thoms declined to stand for any office; his supporters suggested he would run in 1928 on a ticket with Al Smith. Morris took the gubernatorial nomination for the second consecutive campaign, and Probate Court Judge Rollin Tyler was nominated for Senate. The party platform urged for the repeal of Prohibition, which was an "indefensible curtailment of personal liberty," and decentralization of government from Washington to the states.

== General election ==
=== Candidates ===
- Hiram Bingham III, incumbent senator since 1924 (Republican)
- Morris Rice (Socialist)
- Rollin U. Tyler, Probate Court Judge and nominee for governor in 1920 (Democratic)

=== Campaign ===
Bingham and the entire Republican ticket cruised to re-election. By October 31, the New York Times confidently predicted that he would win.

=== Results ===
1926 U.S. Senate election in Connecticut
Party	Candidate	Votes	%	±%
Republican	Hiram Bingham III (incumbent)	191,401	63.31%	▲2.96
Democratic	Rollin U. Tyler	107,753	35.64%	▼2.95
Socialist	Morris Rice	3,173	1.05%	Steady
Total votes		302,327	100.0%	
Republican hold		Swing		

== See also ==
- 1926 United States Senate elections
