= Hiram Bingham II =

American Christian missionary (1831–1908)

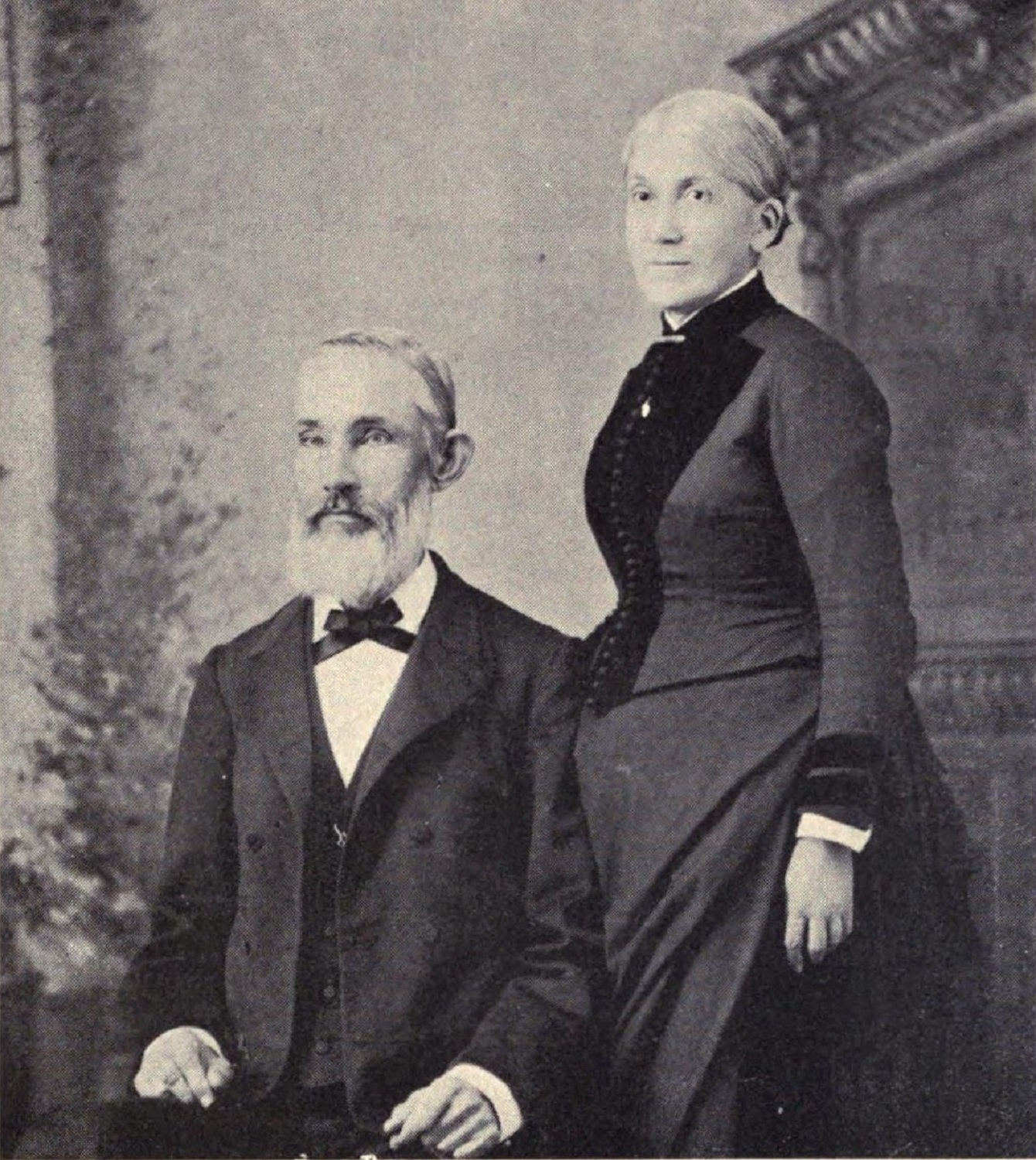
- Hiram II and Clara Brewster Bingham in 1887
- Born: August 16, 1831; Honolulu, Hawaii
- Died: October 25, 1908 (aged 77); Baltimore, Maryland, USA
- Education: Yale College; Andover Seminary
- Occupation: Missionary
- Spouse: Clara Brewster
- Children: Hiram III, and one other
- Parent(s): Hiram I and Sybil Bingham

Hiram Bingham II (August 16, 1831 – October 25, 1908) was a Protestant Christian missionary to Hawaii and the Gilbert Islands.

== Life and career ==
Born in Honolulu, Bingham was the sixth child of early missionary Hiram Bingham I (1789–1869) and Sybil Moseley Bingham (1792–1848). Both father and mother sailed from Boston, Massachusetts, to Honolulu in 1819. Only ten years old in 1840, Bingham was sent to the United States with his siblings Elizabeth Kaahumanu (1829–1899) and Lydia Bingham (1834–1915) to attend school. Bingham was enrolled at Williston Seminary in Easthampton, Massachusetts. He graduated from Yale University in 1853 and then studied at Andover Theological Seminary.

Bingham was ordained a Congregationalist minister in New Haven, Connecticut, on November 9, 1856. Nine days later on November 18, Bingham married Minerva Clara Brewster (1834-1903) in Northampton, Massachusetts; they sailed from Boston two weeks later. The newlyweds arrived in Honolulu on April 24, 1857, where they both ministered to the native Hawaiians as part of American Board of Commissioners for Foreign Missions. They eventually traveled and spread Christianity in several Pacific Ocean island communities, notably at the end of 1857 at the Gilbert Islands.

After a brief return to the United States in 1865, they arrived in Honolulu on March 13, 1867, for a stopover en route to the Marquesas Islands. They went through Micronesia and returned to Honolulu again in 1868. At that time Bingham was the captain of the ‘’Morning Star’’ ship which they were travelling on. They settled in Honolulu. Bingham was the first to translate the Bible into Gilbertese. He wrote several hymn books, dictionaries and commentaries in the language of the Gilbert Islands, as well as other books.

From 1877 to 1880, Bingham served as Secretary of the Hawaiian Board; he then served as government protector of South Sea immigrants for two years. In 1895, Yale University awarded him the Doctorate of Divinity.

Minerva died on 13 November 1903 in Honolulu.

In August 1908, Bingham travelled from Honolulu to the US to correct proofs of his Commentary of the New Testament in the Gilbertese Language; he contracted pneumonia and died October 25, 1908, in Baltimore, Maryland.

== Descendants ==
Bingham's son, Hiram Bingham III, was an explorer who made public the existence of the Inca citadel of Machu Picchu in 1911 with the guidance of local indigenous farmers and later became a US Senator and (briefly) Governor of Connecticut. His grandson, Hiram Bingham IV, was the US Vice Consul in Marseille, France, during World War II who rescued Jews from the Holocaust. Another grandson, Jonathan Brewster Bingham, was a long-time Reform Democratic Congressman from The Bronx from the mid-1960s through the early 1980s.
