= Jonathan B. Bingham =

American politician and diplomat

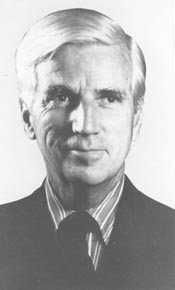

Member of the U.S. House of Representatives from New York
- In office January 3, 1965 – January 3, 1983
- Preceded by: Charles A. Buckley
- Succeeded by: Benjamin A. Gilman (redistricting)
- Constituency: 23rd district (1965–73); 22nd district (1973–83)

Personal details
- Born: Jonathan Brewster Bingham; April 24, 1914 New Haven, Connecticut, US
- Died: July 3, 1986 (aged 72) New York City, US
- Party: Democratic
- Spouse: June Rossbach
- Parent: Hiram Bingham III (father)
- Relatives: Hiram Bingham I (great-grandfather); Hiram Bingham II (grandfather); Hiram Bingham IV (brother)
- Education: Yale University (BA, LLB)
- Awards: War Department citation

Military service
- Branch/service: United States Army
- Years of service: April 1943 - October 1945

Jonathan Brewster Bingham (April 24, 1914 – July 3, 1986) was an American politician and diplomat. He was the US delegate to the United Nations General Assembly and was elected to Congress from The Bronx, serving in the House of Representatives from 1965 to 1983.

== Early life ==
Bingham was born in New Haven, Connecticut. His father, Hiram Bingham III, was a Senator and explorer and his great grandfather, Hiram Bingham I, was a missionary, who helped translate the Bible into Hawaiian.

Bingham attended Hamden Hall Country Day School and Groton School and graduated from Yale University in 1936 with a BA and from Yale Law School in 1939 with a law degree. He was a member of Skull and Bones, class of 1936. In 1940 he was admitted to the bar, and began the practice of law in New York City. His practice was interrupted in August 1941, when he joined the Machinery Branch of the newly created Office of Price Administration (OPA) as a legal advisor.

=== World War II ===
He was not at the OPA for long, for in 1942 he joined the Military Intelligence Service. In April of the following year he was enlisted as a private in the United States Army and was discharged a captain in October 1945 with a War Department citation.

== Diplomat ==
On his return he was appointed chief of the newly created Alien Enemy Control Section of the State Department. The Alien Enemy Control Section was unpopular and short-lived. Bingham got off the boat before it sank, resuming the practice of law in New York City in 1946.

He left the practice of law again in 1951 to become assistant director of the Office of International Security Affairs. Bingham left in the same year to become deputy administrator of the Technical Cooperation Administration, implementing the Point 4 Program of technical assistance to developing countries. His book, Shirt-Sleeve Diplomacy: Point 4 in Action, was published in 1953. He left the administration in that year and resumed the practice of law. In 1955 he became secretary to fellow Bonesman, W. Averell Harriman, while he was Governor of New York. When Harriman was defeated in the 1958 election by Nelson Aldrich Rockefeller, Bingham joined the law firm Goldwater & Flynn.

In 1961 Bingham entered the world of diplomacy, as a United States representative on the United Nations Trusteeship Council with rank of Minister in 1961 and 1962, serving as President in 1962. During this period he was also principal adviser to the U.S. ambassador to U.N. on colonial and trusteeship questions. From 1963 to 1964 he was a United States representative on the United Nations Economic and Social Council with rank of Ambassador. He was also alternate representative to the 15th and 18th United Nations General Assemblies.

== Congress ==
In 1964 he was elected to the House of Representatives from the 23rd District of New York, a district in the Bronx, at a time when elections in the Bronx were decided in the Democratic primaries in contests between "regular" or machine Democrats, and "reform" or challenger Democrats. Bingham defeated Charles Buckley, the leader of the Bronx "regular" Democrats and a powerful, senior committee chairman in Congress, in a rematch following Bingham's defeat in his first try against the incumbent Buckley in the 1962 Democratic primary.

Bingham represented the 23rd District from January 3, 1965 until January 3, 1973, when, as a result of redistricting following the 1970 census, he was elected to the House from the 22nd District of New York following a bruising primary with neighboring Democratic incumbent congressman James H. Scheuer. He served the 22nd District from January 3, 1973 until January 3, 1983, but did not pursue reelection when, in 1982, his district essentially disappeared as a result of another post-census redistricting.

In the House, Bingham served on the Foreign Affairs and Interior and Insular Affairs Committees and chaired the Subcommittee on International Economic Policy and Trade. He was particularly dedicated to nuclear non-proliferation, national security, foreign assistance, and environmental protection. Bingham was instrumental in formulating and obtaining passage of the War Powers Act of 1973, the Trade Act of 1974 (including the Jackson-Vanik Amendment), the Foreign Assistance Act Amendments of 1974 and 1976, the Arms Export Control Act of 1976, the International Emergency Economic Powers Act of 1977, the Foreign Corrupt Practices Act of 1977, and the Export Administration Act of 1979. In 1976 he led a legislative movement opposed by members of the Joint Committee on Atomic Energy to replace the Atomic Energy Commission and create a Nuclear Regulatory Commission as part of a new U.S. Department of Energy. Those changes were adopted in the Energy Act of 1977. The House Subcommittee he chaired formulated and pressed for enactment of the first comprehensive anti-proliferation legislation in U.S. history, the Nuclear Non-Proliferation Act of 1978. It was signed into law by President Carter in a Cabinet Room ceremony in March 1978. Since its enactment, only Pakistan and North Korea have become new nuclear powers. Bingham supported U.S. aid to Israel, particularly for the settlement of Soviet Jewish refugees, and to Romania after the March 1977 Vrancea earthquake, sponsoring a bill to provide $20 million in assistance to the country. He authored and obtained passage of legislation to place a statue of Martin Luther King Jr. in the Capitol Rotunda before a statue of King was erected on the Washington Mall.

== Family ==
He was married to June Rossbach, an author, playwright, and member of the Lehman family (her great-grandfather was Mayer Lehman, one of the founders of the Lehman Brothers firm). They had four children: Sherrell Bingham Downes; Timothy Woodbridge Bingham; Claudia Bingham Meyers; and June Mitchell (Micki) Esselstyn (d. 1999).

After Jonathan Bingham's death, Mrs. Bingham married Robert Birge and was then known as June Bingham Birge.

== Death ==
Bingham died from complications of pneumonia, aged 72, at the Presbyterian Hospital in Manhattan on July 3, 1986.

U.S. House of Representatives
Preceded by Charles A. Buckley	Member of the U.S. House of Representatives from New York's 23rd congressional district 1965–1973	Succeeded by Peter A. Peyser
Preceded by Herman Badillo	Member of the U.S. House of Representatives from New York's 22nd congressional district 1973–1983	Succeeded by Benjamin Gilman
