= Charles A. Templeton =

American politician (1871–1955)

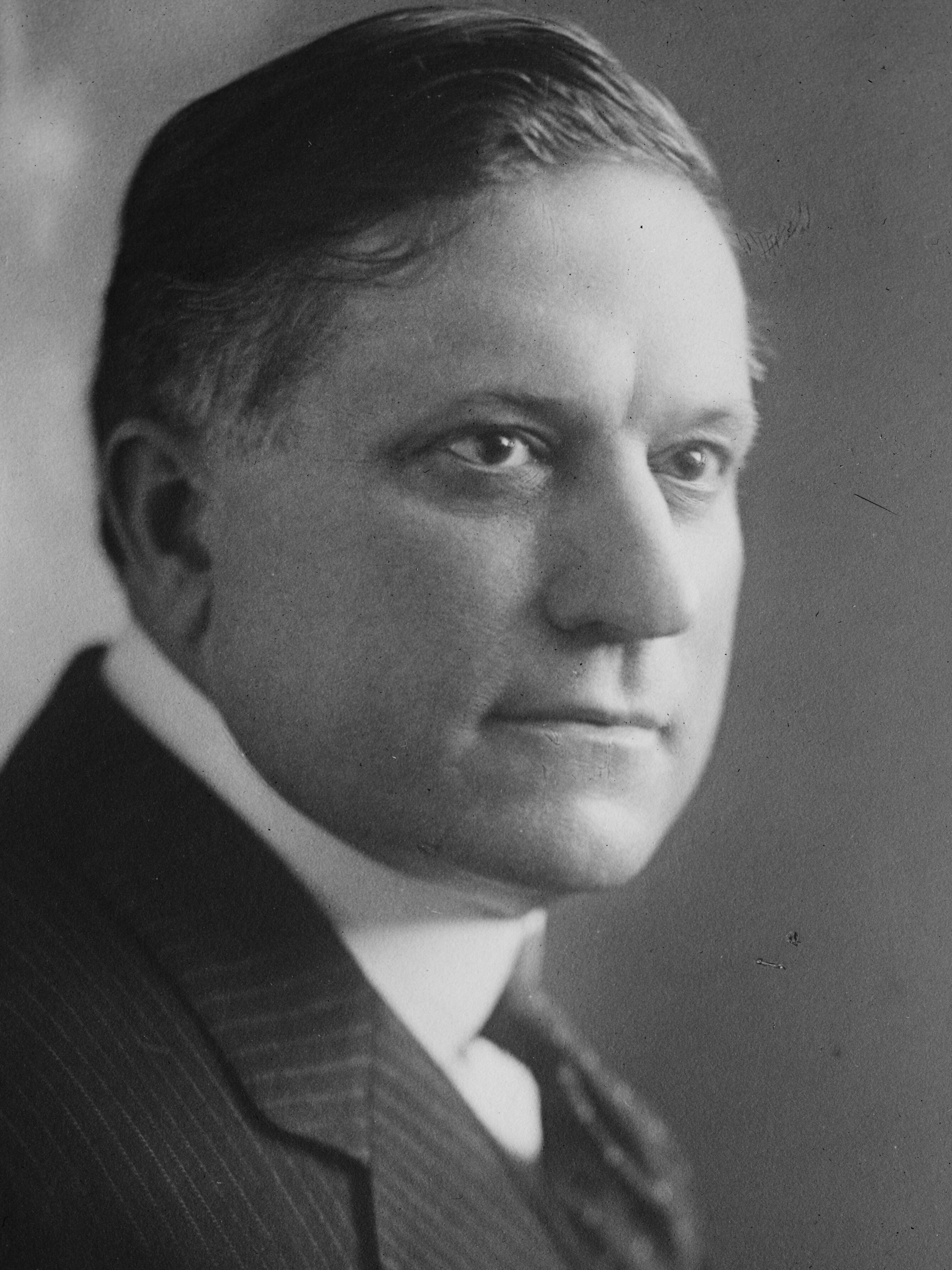

68th Governor of Connecticut
- In office January 3, 1923 – January 7, 1925
- Lieutenant: Hiram Bingham III
- Preceded by: Everett J. Lake
- Succeeded by: Hiram Bingham III

77th Lieutenant Governor of Connecticut
- In office January 5, 1921 – January 3, 1923
- Governor: Everett J. Lake
- Preceded by: Clifford B. Wilson
- Succeeded by: Hiram Bingham III

Member of the Connecticut Senate
- In office 1919-1921

Personal details
- Born: March 3, 1871 Sharon, Connecticut, U.S.
- Died: August 15, 1955 (aged 84) Waterbury, Connecticut, U.S.
- Party: Republican
- Spouse: Martha Amelia Castle Templeton
- Children: 3

Charles Augustus Templeton (March 3, 1871 – August 15, 1955) was an American politician and the 68th governor of the state of Connecticut.

== Biography ==
Templeton was born in Sharon, Connecticut on March 3, 1871, the son of Union Army veteran Theodore Templeton and Ella Middlebrooks Templeton. The family moved to Winsted when the future governor was a young boy. He received some education in local schools, but went to work at the age of eight as an errand boy earning 25 cents a day. On June 17, 1897, he married Martha Amelia Castle, the daughter of John and Amelia (Parsons) Castle. They had three daughters: Katherine, Nancy and Lucy.

== Career ==
As a young man, Templeton worked at several jobs, including machinist at the Seth Thomas Clock Company in Thomaston, janitor at a high school and a church, grocery store clerk, and assistant postmaster of Plymouth. While on a visit to Waterbury, he answered an advertisement for a bookkeeper in a hardware store. In answer to a question of experience keeping books, he replied that he could do any task that anyone else could. He was hired and eventually bought the business with a partner, but later left to open his own hardware business in the city under the name of Charles A. Templeton, Inc. and later became a partner. Later he opened his own wholesale and retail hardware store.

A Republican, Templeton became alderman of Waterbury and later a member for the 15th District of the Connecticut State Senate from 1919 to 1921. He was a delegate to Republican National Convention from Connecticut, 1920. He was the 77th Lieutenant Governor of Connecticut from 1921 to 1923.

Templeton became the Governor of Connecticut in 1923. During his tenure, he didn't allow the Republican state party chairman, J. Henry Roraback, the right to name the secretary to the governor. This alienated his party, and lost the legislature's support for his choice on a state superior court vacancy. He also refused to nominate Roraback’s choice of John A. MacDonald for the position of State Highway Commissioner. Templeton favored a three-man commission for the position. Legislation passed that limited funding to state institutions in order to balance the budget. A bill was enacted that banned medical school correspondence course graduates from practicing in the state of Connecticut. He left office January 7, 1925.

After completing his term as governor, Templeton returned to the hardware business in Waterbury. He also became a trustee of the St. Marguerite School for Girls. He also was the director of Waterbury's YMCA.

== Death ==
Templeton died on August 15, 1955, aged 84. He is interred at Riverside Cemetery, Waterbury, Connecticut.

Party political offices
| Preceded by Everett J. Lake | Republican nominee for Governor of Connecticut; 1922 | Succeeded by Hiram Bingham III |
Political offices
| Preceded by Clifford B. Wilson | Lieutenant Governor of Connecticut; 1921–1923 | Succeeded by Hiram Bingham III |
| Preceded by Everett J. Lake | Governor of Connecticut; 1923–1925 | Succeeded by John H. Trumbull |
