= 1920 Connecticut gubernatorial election =

- November 2, 1920
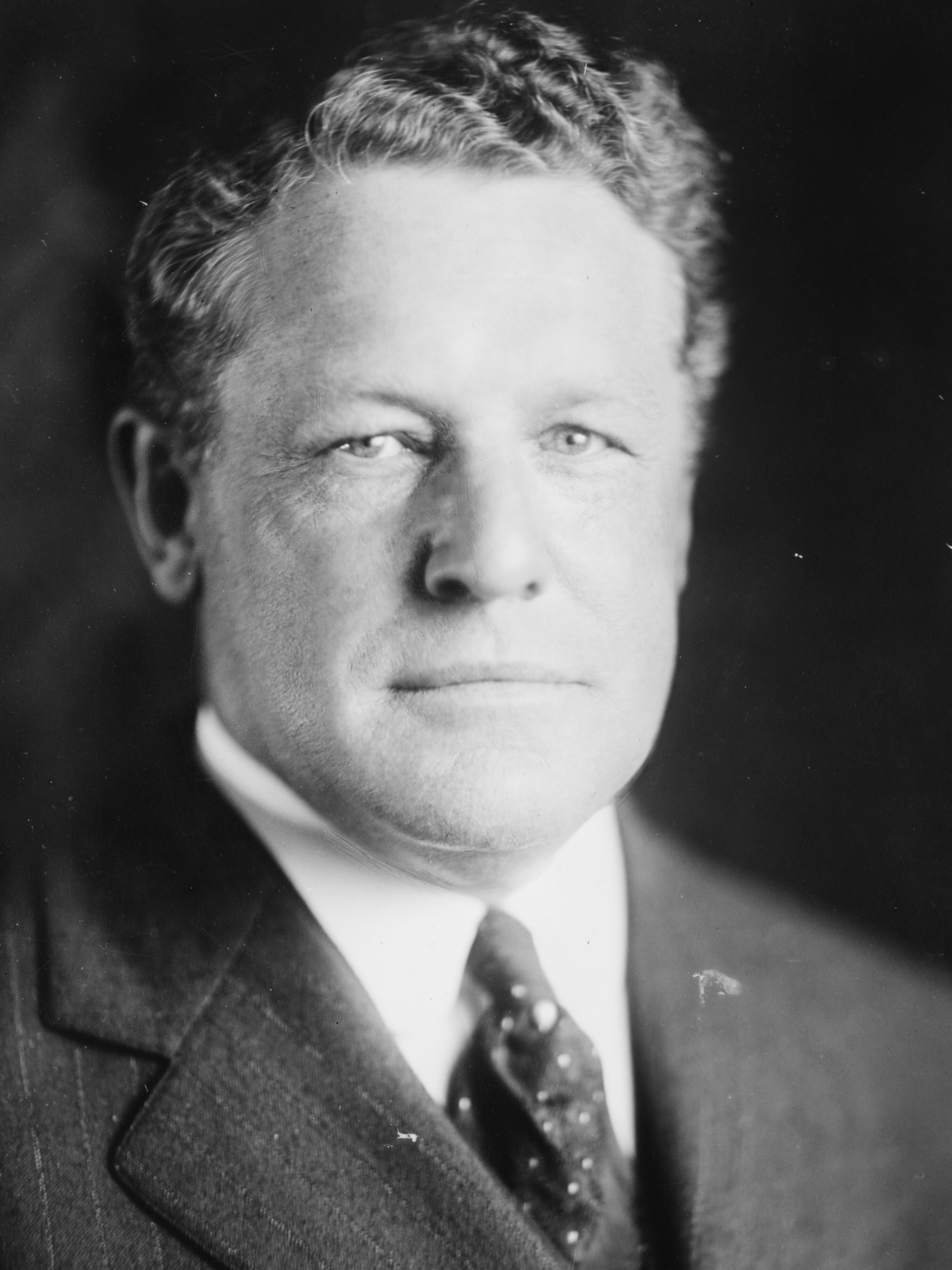

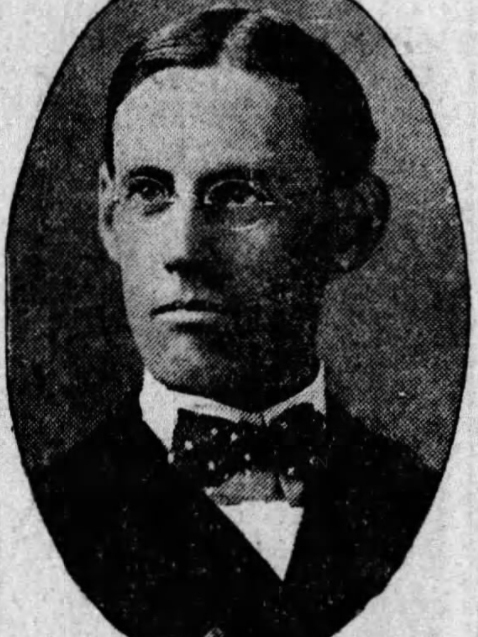
Nominee	Everett J. Lake	Rollin U. Tyler
Party	Republican	Democratic
Popular vote	230,792	121,729
Percentage	63.04%	33.25%
- Lake: 40–50% 50–60% 60–70% 70–80% 80–90% >90% Tyler: 50–60%
Governor before election
Marcus H. Holcomb
Republican
Elected Governor
Everett J. Lake
Republican

The 1920 Connecticut gubernatorial election was held on November 2, 1920. Republican nominee Everett J. Lake defeated Democratic nominee Rollin U. Tyler with 63.04% of the vote.

== General election ==
=== Candidates ===
Major party candidates

- Everett J. Lake, Republican
- Rollin U. Tyler, Democratic

Other candidates

- Charles T. Peach, Socialist
- Edward Pryor, Socialist Labor
- Albert P. Krone, Farmer–Labor

=== Results ===
1920 Connecticut gubernatorial election
Party	Candidate	Votes	%	±%
Republican	Everett J. Lake	230,792	63.04%	+12.32%
Democratic	Rollin U. Tyler	121,729	33.25%	−12.62%
Socialist	Charles T. Peach	10,154	2.77%	+0.38%
Socialist Labor	Edward Pryor	1,896	0.52%	+0.18%
Farmer–Labor	Albert P. Krone	1,517	0.41%	N/A
Majority		109,063		
Turnout				
Republican hold		Swing		
