= Everett J. Lake =

American politician and businessman (1871–1948)

Everett John Lake
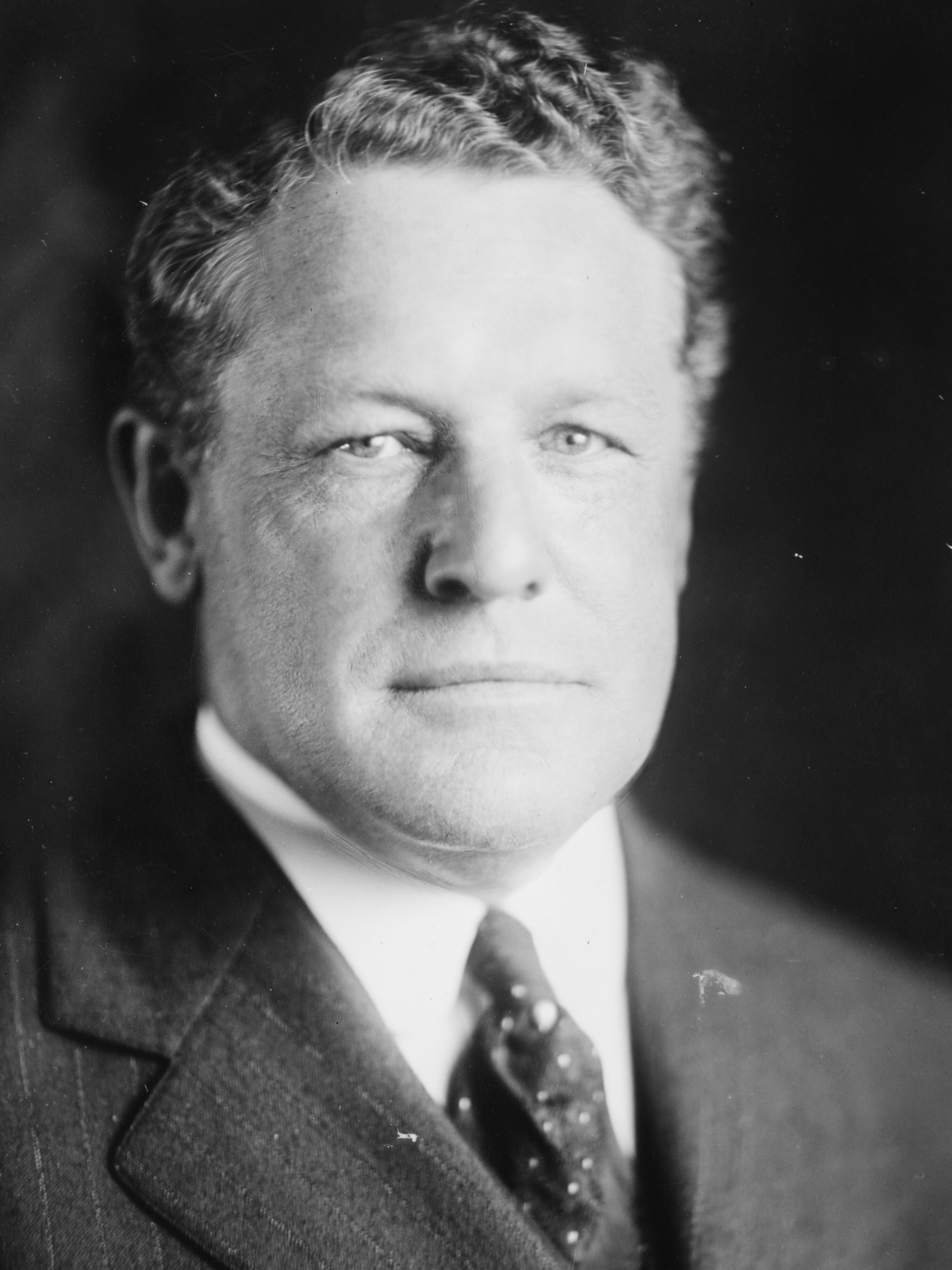

67th Governor of Connecticut
- In office January 5, 1921 – January 3, 1923
- Lieutenant: Charles A. Templeton
- Preceded by: Marcus H. Holcomb
- Succeeded by: Charles A. Templeton

72nd Lieutenant Governor of Connecticut
- In office January 9, 1907 – January 6, 1909
- Governor: Rollin S. Woodruff
- Preceded by: Rollin S. Woodruff
- Succeeded by: Frank B. Weeks

Member of the Connecticut Senate
- In office 1905-1907

Member of the Connecticut House of Representatives
- In office 1903-1905

Personal details
- Born: February 8, 1871 Woodstock, Connecticut, U.S.
- Died: September 16, 1948 (aged 77) Hartford, Connecticut, U.S.
- Party: Republican
- Spouse(s): Eva Louise Sykes Lake, Barbara G. Lincoln Lake
- Children: 2
- Education: Worcester Polytechnic Institute; Harvard University
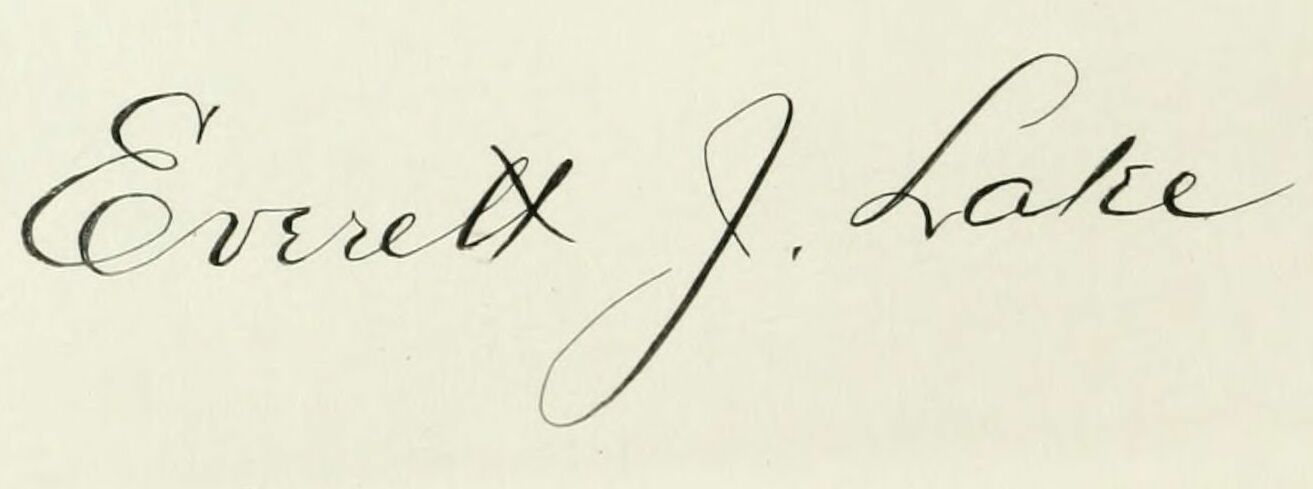
- Signature

Everett J. Lake (February 8, 1871 – September 16, 1948) was an American politician and businessman who served as the 67th governor of Connecticut.

== Early life ==
Lake was born in Woodstock, Connecticut, on February 8, 1871, son of Thomas A. Lake and Martha A. Cockings Lake. He studied at Worcester Polytechnic and graduated in 1890. He then attended Harvard University, where he played for the Harvard Crimson football team. He received consensus All-American football honors in 1891. He graduated from Harvard in 1892.

Lake married three times. His first wife was Eva Louise Sykes, whom he married on September 4, 1895, and with whom he had a son and a daughter, Marjorie S. Lake. Eva Lake died on November 25, 1935, in Boston. Her body was brought back to Connecticut for burial in Cedar Hill Cemetery in Hartford.

After Eva's death, Lake married Mrs. Elizabeth (Keeney) Gordon, the widow of Lewis E. Gordon, on December 24, 1935. She died on August 28, 1936, in Whitefield, New Hampshire, and is also buried in the Cedar Hill Cemetery. Lake's third wife was Barbara Grace Lincoln, a prominent business woman and director of the Sage-Allen store in Hartford. Surviving him by twenty years, Barbara died June 16, 1968, and is buried beside Lake in Ashford.

== Career ==
Lake started his career by working for the Hartford Lumber Company, his father's business. He was the president of Hartford Lumber Company from 1900 to 1939. A Republican, Lake became a representative from Hartford in the Connecticut House of Representatives from 1903 to 1905. He also served as a member of the Connecticut Senate from 1905 to 1907.

Lake became the 72nd lieutenant governor of Connecticut under Rollin S. Woodruff in 1907. He held that position until 1909. He was a delegate to the Republican National Convention from Connecticut in 1912. At the 1920 state convention he supported the nomination of William H. Hall, a close friend. When the delegates became deadlocked over whom to select for governor, Lake was nominated. Not only did he win his party's support, but he also received more votes at the polls than any gubernatorial candidate had ever obtained before, defeating Democratic candidate Rollin U. Tyler by 110,880 votes.

Elected in 1920, Lake became the governor of Connecticut. During his term, a bill was enacted that prohibited child laborers from working more than eight hours a day. A legislation also was constituted that withheld employment certificates from children who were deficient in required schooling.

In 1921 Lake was elected as an honorary member of the Connecticut Society of the Cincinnati.

When Lake left office on January 3, 1923, he continued to work with the Hartford Lumber Company as well as participate in many civic and private organizations. His interest in football did not diminish, and he continued to attend Harvard–Yale games. In 1939, he retired as the president of the Hartford Lumber Company after 39 years.

== Death ==
Lake died in Hartford, Connecticut, on September 16, 1948. He is interred at Westford Village Cemetery, Ashford, Windham County, Connecticut.

== Head coaching record ==
Year	Team	Overall	Conference	Standing	Bowl/playoffs
Harvard Crimson (Independent) (1893)
1893	Harvard	12–1			
Harvard:		12–1			
Trinity Bantams (Independent) (1897)
1897	Trinity	4–5			
Trinity:		4–5			
Total:		16–6			

Party political offices
Preceded by Marcus H. Holcomb	Republican nominee for Governor of Connecticut; 1920	Succeeded by Charles A. Templeton
Political offices
Preceded by Rollin S. Woodruff	Lieutenant Governor of Connecticut; 1907–1909	Succeeded by Frank B. Weeks
Preceded by Marcus H. Holcomb	Governor of Connecticut; 1921–1923	Succeeded by Charles A. Templeton
