= Hiram Bingham IV =

American diplomat (1903–1988)

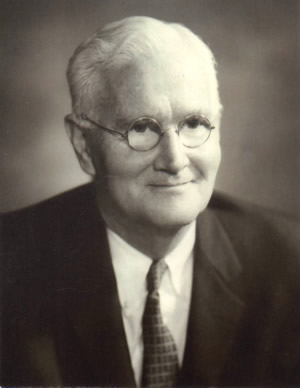
- Born: July 17, 1903
- Died: January 12, 1988 (aged 84); Salem, Connecticut, U.S.
- Education: Hamden Hall Country Day School; Groton School; Yale University (1925)
- Children: 11
- Parent: Hiram Bingham III

Hiram "Harry" Bingham IV (July 17, 1903 – January 12, 1988) was an American diplomat. He served as a Vice Consul in Marseille, France, during World War II, and, along with several humanitarian organizations, helped more than 2,500 refugees, mostly Jews, to escape after the country was defeated by Nazi Germany in June 1940.

== Early life ==
Bingham was one of seven sons of former Governor of Connecticut and U.S. Senator Hiram Bingham III and his first wife, Alfreda Mitchell, heiress of the Tiffany and Co. fortune through her maternal grandfather Charles L. Tiffany. His father was also the first American to explore the Inca ruins at Machu Picchu. His great-grandfather Hiram Bingham I and grandfather Hiram Bingham II were among the first Protestant missionaries to the Kingdom of Hawaiʻi.

Bingham attended the Groton School and graduated from Yale University in 1925.

== Career ==
=== Foreign service ===
Bingham served in Kobe, Japan, as a civilian secretary in the United States embassy. He worked part-time as a schoolteacher. He traveled to India and Egypt before returning to the United States to attend Harvard University. After obtaining his law degree, he scored third in his class on the foreign service exam.

Bingham's first assignment in the United States Foreign Service was in Beijing, China, during the beginning of the communist revolution.

Bingham also served in Warsaw, Poland, sharing an apartment with another diplomat, Charles W. Yost, whose daughter, Felicity, became Bingham's god-daughter. In 1934, Bingham served as third secretary to the United States Embassy in London.

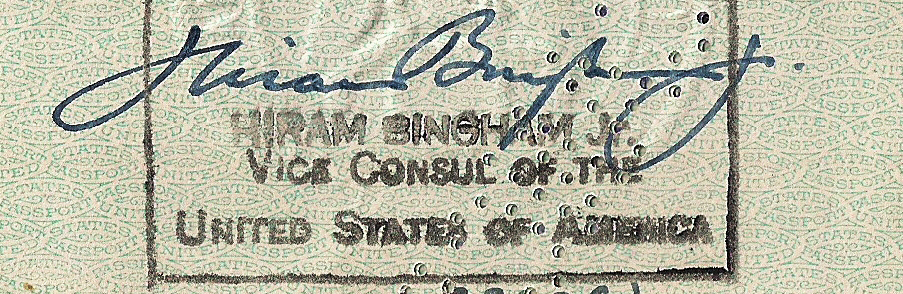
Hiram Bingham's signature in a passport.

=== Vice Consul in France ===
In 1939, Bingham was posted to the US Consulate in Marseille, where he had responsibility for issuing entry visas to the United States.

On May 10, 1940, Adolf Hitler's forces invaded France and the French government fell. The French signed an armistice with Germany and forced most of France's large population of foreign refugees to move to internment camps. Many thousands of refugees went to Marseille to seek visas for the United States and other foreign destinations.

Anxious to limit immigration into the United States and to maintain good relations with the Vichy government, the U.S. State Department discouraged diplomats from helping refugees. In Marseille, as elsewhere, foreign service staff usually showed little flexibility or compassion towards the desperate refugees. However, American rescue workers soon noticed that "Harry" Bingham was an exception. Bingham personally toured some of the wretched internment camps and sought American aid to improve conditions. He helped many refugees to avoid internment and prepare for emigration and freely issued Nansen passports, a useful form of identity for stateless persons. An American rescue worker, Martha Sharp, organized a group of children to leave southern France for the US in late 1940. She had this to say about Bingham, "I am proud that our government is represented in its Foreign Services by a man of your quality," she wrote. "I feel so deeply about this that I shall take the earliest opportunity to transmit it through the Unitarian Service Committee to the United States State Department, for I believe that such humane and cooperative handling of individuals is what we need most coupled with intelligence and good breeding." Bingham also cooperated a great deal with Varian Fry, an effective rescue worker based in Vichy France during 1940 and 1941. Bingham worked with Fry on notable cases, including the emigration of Marc Chagall, political theorist Hannah Arendt, novelist Lion Feuchtwanger, and many other distinguished refugees. In the case of Feuchtwanger, Bingham went so far as to help spirit the novelist out of an internment camp and sheltered him in his own house while plans were made to help the refugee walk over the Pyrenees.

==== Consequence ====
In 1941, the United States government abruptly pulled Bingham from his position as Vice Consul and transferred him to Portugal and then Argentina. When he was in Argentina, he helped to track Nazi war criminals in South America. In early 1946, after being passed over for promotion, he resigned from the United States Foreign Service.

Bingham did not speak much about his wartime activities. His own family had little knowledge of them until after Bingham's death in 1988. In 1991, Bingham's widow Rose and son Thomas found 50-year-old Marseille documents in the family's Connecticut farmhouse. Rose and Thomas subsequently donated these documents to the U.S. Holocaust Memorial Museum. Several years later, Bingham's youngest son found documents in a cupboard behind a chimney and family members continued to unearth documents at the farmhouse. The materials told of Bingham's struggle to save German and Jewish refugees from death, details long hidden from the public.

== Personal life ==
While posted in London, he met Rose Lawton Morrison (1908–1996), a college drama teacher from Waycross, Georgia, whom he escorted to Buckingham Palace to meet the Queen. They later married and had 11 children, including Abigail Bingham Endicott, the mother of Sam Endicott. and Margaret Bingham Turner.

=== Honors ===
Although family members knew some of the details, the whole story became known only when Bingham's youngest son William discovered a tightly wrapped bundle of letters, documents, and photographs hidden in the wall of a cupboard behind a chimney in the family home. As a consequence of the discovery, Hiram Bingham IV has been honored by many groups and organizations including the United Nations, the State of Israel, and by a traveling exhibit entitled "Visas for Life: The Righteous and Honorable Diplomats". The exhibit records the events of that time and the efforts of Bingham and others who risked and lost so much to help their fellow man.

After considering for several years Bingham's deeds during the war years in Marseille, Israel's memorial Yad Vashem ("Holocaust Martyrs' and Heroes' Remembrance Authority") issued the Bingham family a letter of appreciation on March 7, 2005. Although not a Righteous Among the Nations designation, the letter noted the "humanitarian disposition" of Bingham IV "at a time of persecution of Jews by the Vichy regime in France.... [in] contrast to certain other officials who rather acted suspiciously toward Jewish refugees wishing to enter the United States."

On June 27, 2002, U.S. Secretary of State Colin Powell presented a posthumous "Constructive Dissent" award to Bingham's children at an American Foreign Service Officers Association awards ceremony in Washington, D.C. A commemorative postage stamp portraying Hiram Bingham IV as a "Distinguished American Diplomat" was issued by the United States Postal Service on May 30, 2006.

On October 27, 2006, the Anti-Defamation League posthumously presented Bingham its "Courage to Care Award" at the ADL's national conference in Atlanta. In November 2006, the U.S. Episcopal Church added Bingham to a list of "American Saints" published in the book A Year with American Saints with a summary of his life and character.

On March 28, 2011, the Simon Wiesenthal Center posthumously awarded Bingham their Medal of Valor in New York City with a film tribute. The film shows the Nazis on the march in Europe and how US Vice-Consul Bingham rose to the dangerous occasion to save lives. According to The Wall Street Journal, "more than 450 supporters of the Simon Wiesenthal Center gathered for the 2011 Humanitarian Award Dinner. The Medal of Valor was awarded posthumously to Sir Winston Churchill, Hiram Bingham IV, and Pope John Paul II...."
