= Juan de la Torre =

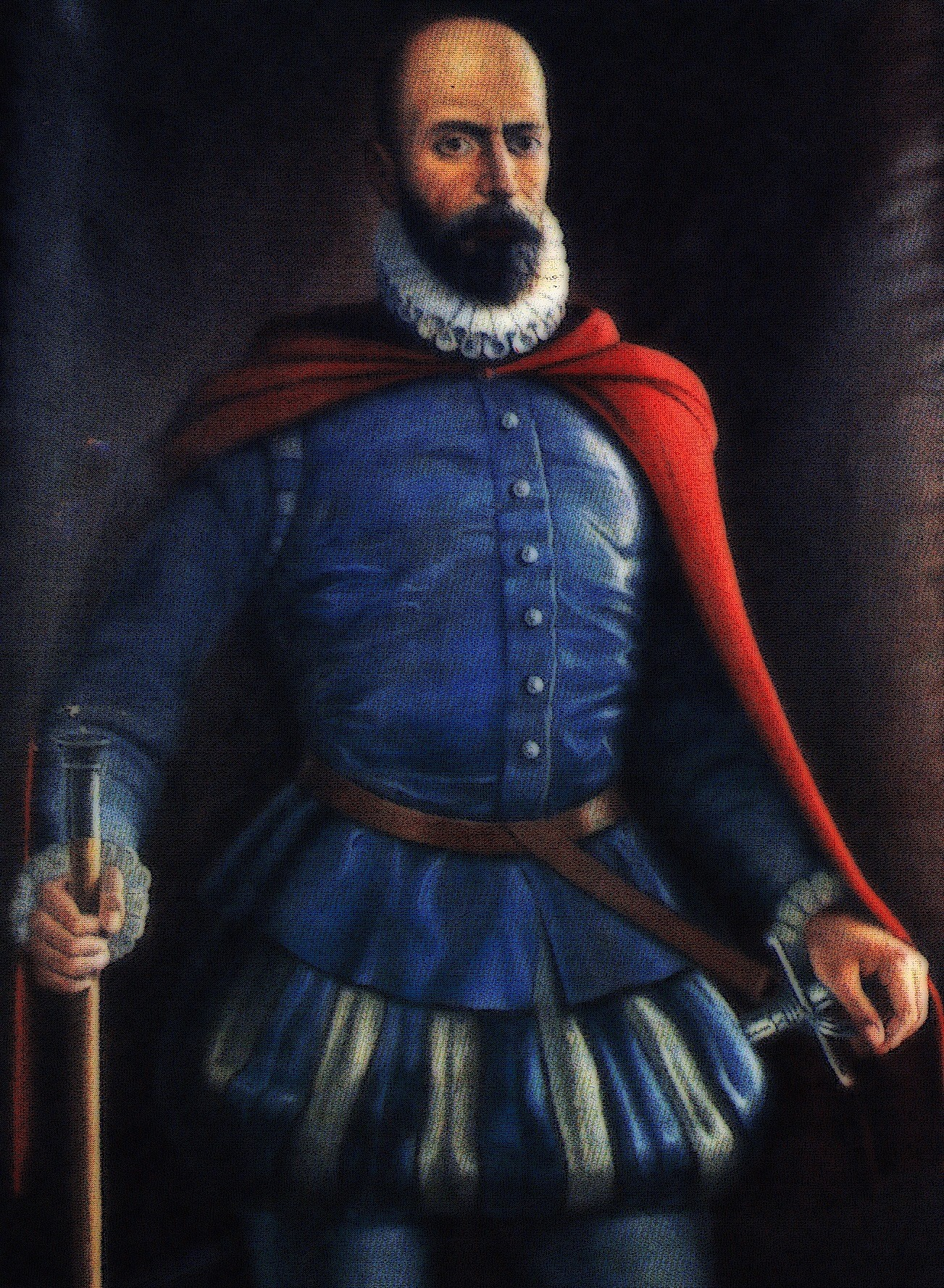
- Portrait of Juan de la Torre

Mayor of Arequipa
- In office 1540–1540
- Preceded by: García Manuel de Carvajal
- Succeeded by: Juan de Flores
- In office 1541–1541
- Preceded by: Juan de Flores
- Succeeded by: Miguel Cornejo
- In office 1552–1552
- Preceded by: Pedro Godínez
- Succeeded by: Francisco Noguerol de Ulloa
- In office 1561–1561
- Preceded by: Gonzalo de Cabrera y Zea
- Succeeded by: Pedro Godínez
- In office 1568–1568
- Preceded by: Pedro Melgar
- Succeeded by: Juan de Castro y Figueroa

Personal details
- Born: c. 1500 Villagracia de la Torre, Crown of Castile
- Died: January 1580 (aged c. 80) Arequipa, Viceroyalty of Peru
- Spouse(s): Catalina de la Feria; Ana Gutiérrez; Beatriz de Casillas y Padilla
- Children: 4

Military service
- Allegiance: Spanish Empire
- Years of service: 1515-1560
- Battles/wars: Spanish conquest of Peru

Juan de la Torre y Díaz Chacón (c. 1500 – January 1580) was a Spanish conquistador, one of the most representative soldiers among the Extremadurans who participated in the conquest of the Americas. He took an active part in the conquest of Peru; he was one of the "Thirteen of the Fame", as well as a founder and the first mayor of the city of Arequipa. During the civil wars among the conquerors of Peru, he remained consistently loyal to the Crown, and for this he was rewarded with several encomiendas of Indigenous people. He served as Mayor of Arequipa on five occasions. He left numerous descendants; among his notable descendants are President Fernando Belaúnde Terry and the political leader Víctor Raúl Haya de la Torre.

== Birth and early years ==
Born around 1500 in Villagarcía de la Torre (Badajoz), he was the son of the hidalgo Hernando de la Torre and Leonor Díaz Chacón. At the age of fifteen, he went with his father to Santo Domingo, and the following year he settled in Puerto Rico, where he held a minor occupation. In 1520, he returned to Santo Domingo, where he held the office of chief bailiff of the Holy Office and received an encomienda of Indigenous people. During his stay in Santo Domingo, he married Catalina de Feria, with whom he had a son. In 1523, he moved to Tierra Firme as part of the military retinue of Francisco de Barrionuevo, who had been appointed governor of Castilla del Oro or Nombre de Dios. After some skirmishes in Urabá with Alonso de Heredia over boundary disputes, he went on to Panama.

== Rise to prominence ==
In Panama, he met Francisco Pizarro, who, together with his partners Diego de Almagro and Hernando de Luque, was organizing a second expedition to the South Sea (1526) in search of the fabulous Inca Empire. He enlisted in that expedition. Throughout the journey, he remained at Pizarro's side as a trusted associate, enduring the many hardships and privations the enterprise demanded. At the same time, he was appointed royal inspector (veedor), tasked with safeguarding the Crown's interests should gold or other riches be found. He was among the thirteen men who, on September 27, 1527, while stranded on Gallo Island, supported Pizarro in his determination to continue searching for the Inca Empire and the fabled gold. Posterity remembers these thirteen as the “Famous Thirteen”. This act was rewarded by the king through the Capitulation of Toledo, which granted hidalgo status to those among the Thirteen who lacked it, and bestowed upon those who already possessed it (as in De la Torre's case) the title of “Knights of the Band and the Golden Spur.”

After his stay on Gallo Island, he moved to Gorgona Island and, together with Pizarro, continued exploring southward, reaching the northern coast of present-day Peru. He then returned to Panama, where he remained while Pizarro traveled to Spain to secure royal support. With Pizarro's return—having obtained significant royal grants from Charles V through the Capitulation of Toledo—De la Torre joined the third expedition to Peru in 1531, holding the high rank of Maestre de Campo General, granted by Pizarro himself. He took part in the early engagements at Tumbes and attended the founding of San Miguel de Piura, the first Spanish city in Peru. He remained in that city, commanding the garrison left by Pizarro, while Pizarro proceeded to Cajamarca to meet the Inca Atahualpa. Consequently, he did not participate in Atahualpa's capture or in the division of the ransom. According to the Capitulation of Toledo, De la Torre was to serve as councilman (regidor) of the city of Tumbes. However, since the city was not founded, he could not fulfill that mandate; nor did he claim the post when San Miguel was founded, or he was about to do so when an unfortunate incident occurred.

=== Unjust sentence ===
In 1532, he was accused of placing a sign on the door of the church in San Miguel de Piura that satirically attacked Pizarro and his brothers. The only evidence against him was the handwriting, which closely resembled his own. De la Torre maintained his innocence, but he was subjected to torture and, in that state, was unable to defend himself effectively, ultimately being coerced into admitting guilt. He was then sentenced to death for sedition. Although deeply hurt by what he saw as his friend's betrayal, Pizarro spared his life, but ordered that the tips of his fingers be cut off and exiled him to Panama. From there, he went to Santo Domingo, where he reunited with his wife Catalina de Feria and their now-adolescent son, and devoted himself for a time to managing his properties. Some time later, the confession of a dying soldier restored his honor, as the man declared that De la Torre had not been responsible for the offense. Pizarro then pardoned him and asked him to return to Peru to resume his post.

== Return to Peru ==
In 1536, he returned to Peru and resumed his military duties. His reunion with Pizarro was highly emotional, and the governor publicly reiterated his apologies. At that time, the rebellion of Manco Inca had broken out, prompting Pizarro to call for reinforcements. De la Torre participated in the defense of Lima during the siege by Manco Inca's forces and in the pacification of coastal chiefdoms.

=== During the first civil war between Pizarrists and Almagristas ===
The bitter disputes between the followers of Pizarro and those of Almagro led to violent clashes that escalated into civil war. De la Torre accompanied Pizarro to his meeting with Diego de Almagro the Elder at Mala. He later remained in Lima while the conflict unfolded in the interior. Almagro was ultimately defeated at the Battle of Las Salinas and executed in Cuzco on July 8, 1538. After the defeat of the Almagristas, De la Torre accompanied Pizarro to Cuzco, and possibly to Charcas. In reward for his services, he received the encomienda of Machaguay in Condesuyos by a document signed in Cuzco on January 22, 1540.

=== Founding of Arequipa ===
On August 15, 1540, Juan de la Torre was among the founders of the Villa of the Assumption of Our Lady of the Beautiful Valley of Arequipa, in collaboration with Lieutenant Governor Garci Manuel de Carbajal, who had previously selected the site. Once Arequipa was founded and its first houses built, he was appointed mayor of the city, receiving two fanegas of land for his residence and stables, as well as 800 tributary Indigenous people.

=== During the second civil war between Pizarrists and Almagristas ===
On June 26, 1541, Governor Francisco Pizarro was assassinated in his palace in Lima by supporters of Diego de Almagro the Younger, sparking the second civil war. At that time, De la Torre was serving as mayor of Arequipa. When the royal investigator Cristóbal Vaca de Castro arrived in Peru to resolve the conflict, De la Torre placed himself under his command and joined him in Huamanga. He followed him into campaign until the Battle of Chupas, where Almagro the Younger was defeated and later executed on September 16, 1542. After the war, De la Torre returned to Arequipa.

=== During the rebellion of Gonzalo Pizarro ===
The New Laws of 1542 sought to improve the conditions of Indigenous peoples, particularly by reforming the encomienda system, but provoked widespread opposition among conquistadors. Gonzalo Pizarro emerged as the leader of this resistance. Blasco Núñez Vela arrived as the first viceroy of Peru to enforce these laws. De la Torre, a loyalist, joined him in Lima. However, at the Battle of Iñaquito in 1546, Gonzalo Pizarro defeated and executed the viceroy. De la Torre refused to recognize Gonzalo's authority and returned to Arequipa, where he was stripped of his encomienda and persecuted, narrowly escaping death. He later joined Diego Centeno in support of the Crown, but their forces were defeated at the Battle of Huarina in 1547. Wounded, De la Torre returned to Arequipa, where his property was looted and he was forced into hiding with his wife Ana Gutiérrez. When Pedro de la Gasca arrived with broad royal powers to restore order, De la Torre again took up arms for the Crown. At the Battle of Jaquijahuana in 1548, Gonzalo Pizarro was defeated and executed.

=== Rewards granted ===
In recognition of his loyal service, De la Torre was granted the encomienda of Camaná and later those of Ocoña, Acarí, Chuquimarca, and others. Having been widowed in 1544, he remarried Ana Gutiérrez of Zamora, and after her death, married a third time in July 1551 to Beatriz de Casillas Padilla y Narváez of Granada, daughter of Captain Francisco de Casillas y Narváez and Inés de Padilla. In 1552, he again served as mayor of Arequipa for two consecutive years.

=== During the last encomendero rebellion ===
Discontent persisted despite Gonzalo Pizarro's execution, and Francisco Hernández Girón led a new uprising. De la Torre joined royalist forces under Marshal Alonso de Alvarado. After several battles, Hernández Girón was defeated at the Battle of Pucará and executed. One of De la Torre's sons, also named Juan de la Torre y Feria, was executed for having joined Hernández Girón's forces. It is said that De la Torre refused to defend his son and even publicly declared that he deserved punishment for betraying the king.

== Marriages and children ==
With his first wife, Catalina de Feria, Juan de la Torre had one son, Juan de la Torre y Feria, who died without issue. After the death of his first wife, he remarried Ana Gutiérrez, with whom he had no children. He later married a third time, to Beatriz de Casillas y Padilla, with whom he had three children:

- Hernando de la Torre y Padilla, born around 1553 in Peru, was mayor of Arequipa and a prominent figure in early colonial southern Peru. He married doña Catalina de Contreras y Rivera, with whom he had numerous descendants.
- Inés de Padilla y Casillas, born around 1555 in Peru, married Baltazar del Alcázar y Zúñiga, with issue.
- Francisco de Casillas, born around 1560 in Peru, was the youngest son and died without issue.

== Final years and death ==
After the conflict, De la Torre returned to Arequipa and resumed civic life, serving as royal treasurer (contador) from 1552 to 1561, as mayor again in 1561 and 1568, and later as perpetual councilman from 1569 to 1575. He also received Viceroy Francisco de Toledo during his visit to the region. In his later years, he devoted himself to religious life, adopting a somewhat mystical demeanor. He wore a black cassock and walked the streets on Sundays and feast days, gathering Indigenous people and compelling them to attend Mass. He died in Arequipa in January 1580, at around eighty years of age, as the last surviving member of the early conquistadors of Peru, the so-called “hueste perulera”.
