= Pedro Pizarro =

Spanish conquistador and chronicler

- Born: c. 1515; Toledo
- Died: c. 1602; Arequipa
- Occupations: Chronicler, conquistador

Pedro Pizarro (c. 1515 – c. 1602) was a Spanish chronicler and conquistador. He took part in most events of the Spanish conquest of Peru and wrote an extensive chronicle of them under the title Relación del descubrimiento y conquista de los reinos del Perú ("Relation of the discovery and conquest of the kingdoms of Peru"), which he finished in 1571.

== Biography ==
Pedro Pizarro was born around 1515 in the Spanish city of Toledo. Through his father he was first cousin of Francisco Pizarro and his half-brothers: Gonzalo Pizarro, Hernando Pizarro and Juan Pizarro. When Francisco left Spain for his third expedition to Peru he was joined by his half-brothers and his cousin Pedro. They sailed from Sanlúcar de Barrameda in February 1530 and arrived at Tumbes in what is now Peru in January 1531. Pedro initially served as page to his cousin Francisco but from about 1533 he was in active military service as a cavalryman. As such he took part in most of the chief events of the conquest of the Inca empire, mainly during the campaigns against Manco Inca.

Pedro Pizarro fought at the Battle of Las Salinas (April 26, 1538) against Diego de Almagro, rival and former partner of Francisco Pizarro. He then took part in the foundation of the city of Arequipa (August 15, 1540) where he established himself. The almagristas revolted again in 1541, murdering Francisco Pizarro, so Pedro Pizarro fought them at the Battle of Chupas (September 16, 1542) under the command of Cristóbal Vaca de Castro. When Gonzalo Pizarro revolted against the Spanish Crown, Pedro Pizarro refused his requests to join his rebellion. However, his loyalty was put in doubt for a letter he wrote to his cousin on December 18, 1546, which shows some vacillations in his loyalty probably prompted by material considerations. This letter fell into the hands of Pedro de la Gasca, an envoy sent by the Crown to pacify the country. La Gasca used the letter as an excuse to deny Pedro Pizarro the rewards he claimed after the Battle of Xaquixaguana (April 9, 1548) where Gonzalo Pizarro was defeated.

Despite this rebuff, Pedro Pizarro could be considered a rich and well-rewarded man. On November 28, 1538, he had received from Francisco Pizarro lands and native workers in Arequipa, Tacna and other regions; he received further grants from time to time by various authorities. In corregimiento de Arica he was awarded in 1540 approximately 600 indigenous tributaries making him one the three main encomenderos in the area.

When he was very young, he fathered a natural daughter, Isabel Pizarro; he later had numerous legitimate children. Pedro Pizarro married twice: his first wife was María Cornejo, but nothing is known about his second wife. The death date of Pedro Pizarro is not known. It happened after 1571 when he finished writing his chronicle and could have taken place as late as 1602 when viceroy Luis de Velasco, marqués de Salinas made a grant to a Pedro Pizarro, however, this Pedro may have been a son of the chronicler.

== Pizarro's Relación ==
Based on his personal observation from 1531 to 1555, Pedro Pizarro wrote a chronicle of the Spanish conquest of Peru, which he completed in 1571 under the title Relación del descubrimiento y conquista de los reinos del Perú ("Relation of the discovery and conquest of the kingdoms of Peru"). The manuscript of Relación that was at the National Library of Spain, however, has been lost and the only remaining copy is located at The Huntington Library. The work remained in manuscript until its inclusion in the fifth volume of the Colección de documentos inéditos para la historia de España, published in 1844 in Madrid. The first English translation was published by Philip A. Means in 1921 in New York; the standard modern edition in Spanish is that edited by Guillermo Lohmann Villena in 1978 in Lima.
