= Battle of Abancay =

Battle that took place during the Spanish conquest of Peru

Coordinates: 13°38′S 72°53′W

- Part of The Spanish conquest of Peru
Date	12 July 1537
Location	Near Abancay, Peru
Result	Nueva Toledo victory

Belligerents
Nueva Castilla	Nueva Toledo

Commanders and leaders
Alonso de Alvarado (POW)	Diego de Almagro; Rodrigo Orgóñez

Strength
Unknown	Unknown

Casualties and losses
Unknown, but probably higher	Unknown

The Battle of Abancay took place during the Spanish conquest of Peru. Alonso de Alvarado, sent by Francisco Pizarro to relieve the siege of Cusco, was camped at Jauja with five hundred men. He guarded the bridge and a ford on the Rio de Abancay, awaiting Almagro's men. However, the soldier Alvarado placed in command of the ford, Pedro de Lerma, deserted, allowing Almagro to capture Alvarado's force almost intact.

After emerging as the victor both in the siege of Cuzco and from initial disputes between the Pizarro brothers with allies and the Almagristas under Diego de Almagro, who had seized the former Inca capital upon rescuing Hernando Pizarro and Gonzalo Pizarro from emerging defeat, imprisoning them both.

Unable to break the siege on his own, and having lost his youngest brother, Pizarro gathered a new army from Spanish settlers traveling to New Castile to find further wealth. The expedition force, commanded by Alonso de Alvarado, was completely defeated by Almagrist forces.

Alvarado was captured during the battle but managed to escape with Gonzalo Pizarro when Marshal Almagro left the main force with Hernando under his control. Hernando was later released as well with the condition that he would return to Spain within six weeks to ensure Francisco would not interfere in Almagro's future reign in Peru. This proved to be a mistake as the Pizarro brothers and Alvarado raised another army and in less than a year faced Almagro yet again in a struggle for power at Las Salinas, in April 1538.
