= Pascual de Andagoya =

Spanish Basque conquistador

Pascual de Andagoya (1495–1548) was a Spanish Basque conquistador. He was born in the village of Andagoya, in the valley of Cuartango (Álava), in Spain.

As often happened at the time, Andagoya left as an explorer of the New World at a very young age of 19, on April 11, 1514, under the command of Pedro Arias de Ávila. The expedition left carrying an army of over 2,000 in 22 ships, with the objective of colonizing Central America.

The career of Andagoya commenced in Panama, whose capital Panama City he founded in 1519 with 400 settlers. Later he moved south towards the Colombian coast, until he reached San Juan, where he took charge as governor.

This was when he learned of the existence of the Inca Empire, in the distant territory called "Birú", or "Pirú". In 1522 he attempted a conquest, but it ended in failure.

With his health deteriorating, he returned to Panama and spread word of his discoveries, in particular the existence of a land of enormous riches of gold and silver, namely, Peru. In 1524 Francisco Pizarro, in association with the soldier Diego de Almagro and the priest Hernando de Luque, mounted an expedition using Andagoya's ships.

Andagoya was rewarded in 1539 by Carlos I with the post of Representative of the Indians, which he performed with brutal zeal. In 1540 he proclaimed himself governor of Popayán, which he held until 1542, when the legitimate governor Sebastián de Belalcázar relieved him under pressure. Andagoya died in Cuzco on July 18, 1548.

== Works ==
- Narrative of the Proceedings of Pedrarias Davila
