= Alonso de Alvarado =

Spanish conquistador

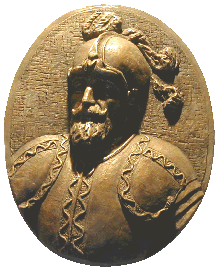
- Alonso de Alvarado
- Born: 1500; Secadura de Trasmiera, Crown of Castille
- Died: 1556 (aged 55–56); Lima, Viceroyalty of Peru
- Occupation: Conquistador

Alonso de Alvarado Montaya González de Cevallos y Miranda (1500–1556) was a Spanish conquistador and knight of the Order of Santiago.

Born in Secadura de Trasmiera, Spain, Alvarado served under Hernán Cortés in Mexico before joining Francisco Pizarro's campaign in Peru.

In 1534, he arrived in Peru with his uncle Pedro de Alvarado. He participated in several key battles during the conquest and subsequent civil wars (1537–1555), including the defense of Lima against Manco Inca Yupanqui's siege (1536), the Battle of Las Salinas (1538), and later conflicts at Chupas and Jaquijahuana.

While some contemporaries accused him of greed and brutality, Alvarado remained a loyal supporter of the Spanish crown throughout the Peruvian civil wars. He consistently sided with those he believed best represented royal authority, even when such alliances were risky or unprofitable.

In 1537, he commanded Pizarro's forces against Diego de Almagro's claim on Cuzco. Although defeated and captured at the Battle of Abancay, he escaped and rejoined Pizarro. He participated in subsequent conflicts as a prominent military leader, though not always achieving victories. Nonetheless, he held a high military position and was considered to be a pillar of the Spanish cause.

Alvarado married during a brief visit to Spain in 1544.

In 1553, when Francisco Hernández Girón rebelled, Alvarado led the royalist forces. Having suffered a decisive defeat at the Battle of Chuquinga (1554), he became dejected, fell ill, and died.

His most significant achievement was the pacification of Chachapoyas in northeastern Peru (1535–1536). This conquest marked the first Spanish foray into the Amazon basin from Peru.

== Search for El Dorado ==
Alonso de Alvarado was a forerunner of the expeditions that penetrated the Amazon basin. In 1535, he departed from Trujillo, Peru, crossed the Andes, and reached the land of the Chachapoyas. A few years later, Chachapoyas, the capital of the department of Amazonas, was founded in this region.

The chronicler Pedro Cieza de León mentions the founding:

On the fifth of September in the year of the Lord one thousand five hundred and thirty-eight, Jesus Christ, with sixty Spaniards under the control of Captain Alonso de Alvarado arrived in [...] "Xalca" and made the first foundation of Chachapoyas.

Captain Luis Valera, father of the Chachapoya Jesuit Blas Valera, was also present at the founding. The Inca Garcilaso de la Vega drew on Blas Valera's chronicles for his descriptions of Tawantinsuyu in his "Royal Commentaries of the Incas."

While in Chachapoyas, Alvarado learned of the legend of El Dorado. He organized further expeditions along the Marañón River, founding the city of Moyobamba in 1540.

== Civil Wars in Peru ==
Alvarado participated in the Peruvian civil wars, fought between Diego de Almagro and Francisco Pizarro. Captured by Almagro in 1537, he escaped and rejoined Pizarro's forces. Siding with the crown, Alvarado helped defeat Almagro's followers at the Battle of Las Salinas in 1538.

Following Pizarro's orders, Alvarado sought an ideal location for a city halfway between Lima and Cuzco in 1539. He co-founded the city of Huamanga, now known as Ayacucho, with Francisco de Cárdenas.

In 1541, Diego de Almagro II ("El Mozo") assassinated Francisco Pizarro, seeking revenge for his father's execution. The following year, Governor Cristóbal Vaca de Castro, allied with Alvarado, defeated El Mozo at the Battle of Chupas. Alvarado's loyalty and merits earned him recognition from King Charles I of Spain. He was admitted to the Order of Santiago and appointed Marshal of Peru. He also married during his time in Spain.

Having returned to Peru in 1546, in April 1548, he reaffirmed his loyalty to the crown by fighting against Gonzalo Pizarro, Francisco Pizarro's rebelling brother. Under Pedro de la Gasca's command, he secured victory at the Battle of Jaquijahuana. However, this victory did little to quell discontent among Spanish settlers, who were opposed to the growing authority of the Spanish Crown's representatives. In 1553, as captain-general and chief justice in La Plata and Potosí, he quelled a rebellion led by Sebastián de Castilla. Defeated by Francisco Hernández Girón's rebel forces in the Battle of Chuquinga in 1554, Alvarado died in Lima in 1556.

Chachapoyas, founded by the Spanish, served as a port city for numerous expeditions venturing into the rainforest. The legend of El Dorado, a city of gold, fueled the early explorers' thirst for wealth. Though obsessed with finding this mythical treasure, their expeditions faced unforeseen hardships – famine, disease, hostile indigenous groups, and the treacherous rainforest itself.

The El Dorado envisioned by the conquistadors was a city with streets and temples paved with gold, embellished with massive golden structures and plazas. Its location was variously believed to be north of Chachapoyas, near Quillabamba, or even deeper in the central rainforest or in Colombia. While the legend ultimately proved to be a myth, it nonetheless opened the door to the initial colonization and evangelization of vast, remote regions of South America.

== Sources ==
- Taken from es.wikipedia.org Alonso de Alvarado
