= Diego de Almagro's expedition to Chile =

16th-century Spanish expedition in western South America

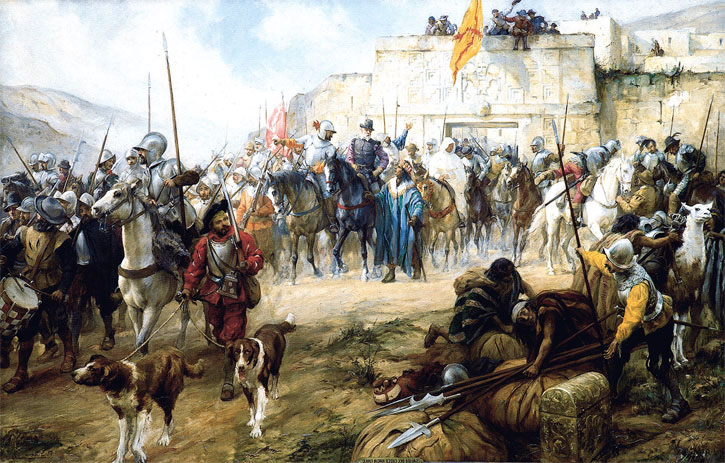
Expedición de Almagro a Chile, a dramatized painting by Pedro Subercaseaux.

Diego de Almagro's expedition to Chile between 1535 and 1537 was a major effort that led to significant Spanish exploration of present-day Bolivia, Argentina and Chile. For the conquistador Diego de Almagro who led it, the expedition was a failure as he did not find the riches he expected. Albeit the initial aim was to conquer the area of Chile, Diego de Almagro declined this option and returned to Cuzco. The expedition gave the lands of Chile a bad reputation among the Spanish in Peru. The conquest of Chile was therefore initiated in 1540 by Pedro de Valdivia.

The expedition was supported by Francisco Pizarro, purportedly because it was a way to rid him of Almagro's ambitions into his claims in Peru. Within just five months Almagro assembled the expedition which in fact was the largest army at the moment in the Americas. It is estimated that the expedition was made up of 500 Spanish, 100 black African slaves and between 10 and 15 thousand indigenous subjects. Before departure, Almagro also made arrangements for a maritime expedition to arrive with supplies such as valuable iron when he was to be in Chile. The main expedition ventured into present-day Bolivia first along the shores of Lake Titicaca and then into the indigenous settlement and tambo of Paria. In Paria the expedition halted for one month, having been warned that adverse climatic condition in winter may cause large losses to the expedition. Continuing south, the expeditionary forces regrouped again in Tupiza. A small foraging party sent into Jujuy was killed by local people, prompting Almagro to dispatch a 80-men strong punitive expedition that dislodged hostile forces that had fortified in a pucará. Having left Tupiza, the expedition followed Jujuy River south and arrived to the plains of Chicoana where they again foraged and engaged in skirmishes with local people. This time however Diego de Almagro's life was put in real danger as he was thrown off his horse when it was hit by an arrow during a pursuit of hostile skirmishers.

From the Argentine Northwest the expedition crossed the Andes into present-day Chile (Note: Incas did not considered the lands of Copiapó, "province of Copayapo", as part of the "province of Chile" which lied form them further south.) at the latitudes of Copiapó and arrived at the Copiapó Valley in early April 1536 and at Aconcagua Valley in June 1536. From there, Diego de Almagro sent Gómez de Alvarado south in charge of a scouting troop. Alvarado reached the Itata River where he engaged in the Battle of Reynogüelén with local Mapuches.

== Notable expeditionaries ==
- Diego de Almagro
- Diego, El Mozo, son of Diego Almagro
- Gómez de Alvarado, Spanish soldier, member of the Alvarado family
- Malgarida, former black African slave and concubine of Diego de Almagro
- Paullu Inca, Inca noble loyal to the Spanish
- Villac Umu, Inca high priest

== List of sites visited by the expedition ==
=== 1535 ===
- Lake Titicaca, Bolivia–Peru
- Paria, Bolivia
- Tupiza, Bolivia
- Jujuy, Argentina

=== 1536 ===
- Tupiza, Bolivia
- Chicoana, Argentina
- Tinogasta (possibly), Argentina
- A mountain pass, possibly:
  - San Francisco Pass, Argentina–Chile
  - Pircas Negras, Argentina–Chile
- Copiapó, Chile
- Chañarcillo, Chile
- Huasco, Chile
- Coquimbo, Chile
- Aconcagua, Chile
- Reynogüelén, Chile
