= Malgarida =

African conquistadora and slave (born c. 1488)

Malgarida or Margarita (born c. 1488) was a 16th-century African conquistadora and the concubine and servant of Diego de Almagro. She was the former slave of Almagro who freed her on the condition of she becoming his servant-for-life.

== Biography ==
Knowledge about her early life is scant. At an age of 25 and while she was pregnant, she was purchased in Spain by a man named Juan Fuico in 1513. Then, at about 38 years of age and still a slave, she was transferred from Spain to Spanish America. In the autumn of 1536, at an age of 48 years, she crossed the Andes from east to west at the San Francisco Pass as part of Diego de Almagro's expedition to Chile. By doing this, she became the first non-Amerindian woman to enter the territory of what is today Chile. She was the primary caretaker of the young Diego de Almagro II; Diego de Almagro's son born to an indigenous Panamanian named Ana Martínez.

After the execution of Almagro in 1538, she took care of his remains that had been left on display in the public square of Cusco. After avenging his father in a 1541 coup d'état in which Francisco Pizarro was killed, Diego Almagro II was also executed in 1542. In 1553, Malgarida provided funds for the establishment of a chaplaincy in Convento de la Merced in Cusco where Diego Almagro, father and son, were then buried. When she died years later, she was also buried there.

The history of Malgarida was first exposed with some detail in the 1981 book La Mujer en el Reyno de Chile by Sor Imelda Cano Roldán, a Mercedarian religious sister who was once an assistant to Professor Jaime Eyzaguirre.

== See also ==
- Beatriz de Palacios
- Inés de Suárez
- Juan Valiente
