= Cristóbal Vaca de Castro =

Spanish explorer (1492–1566)

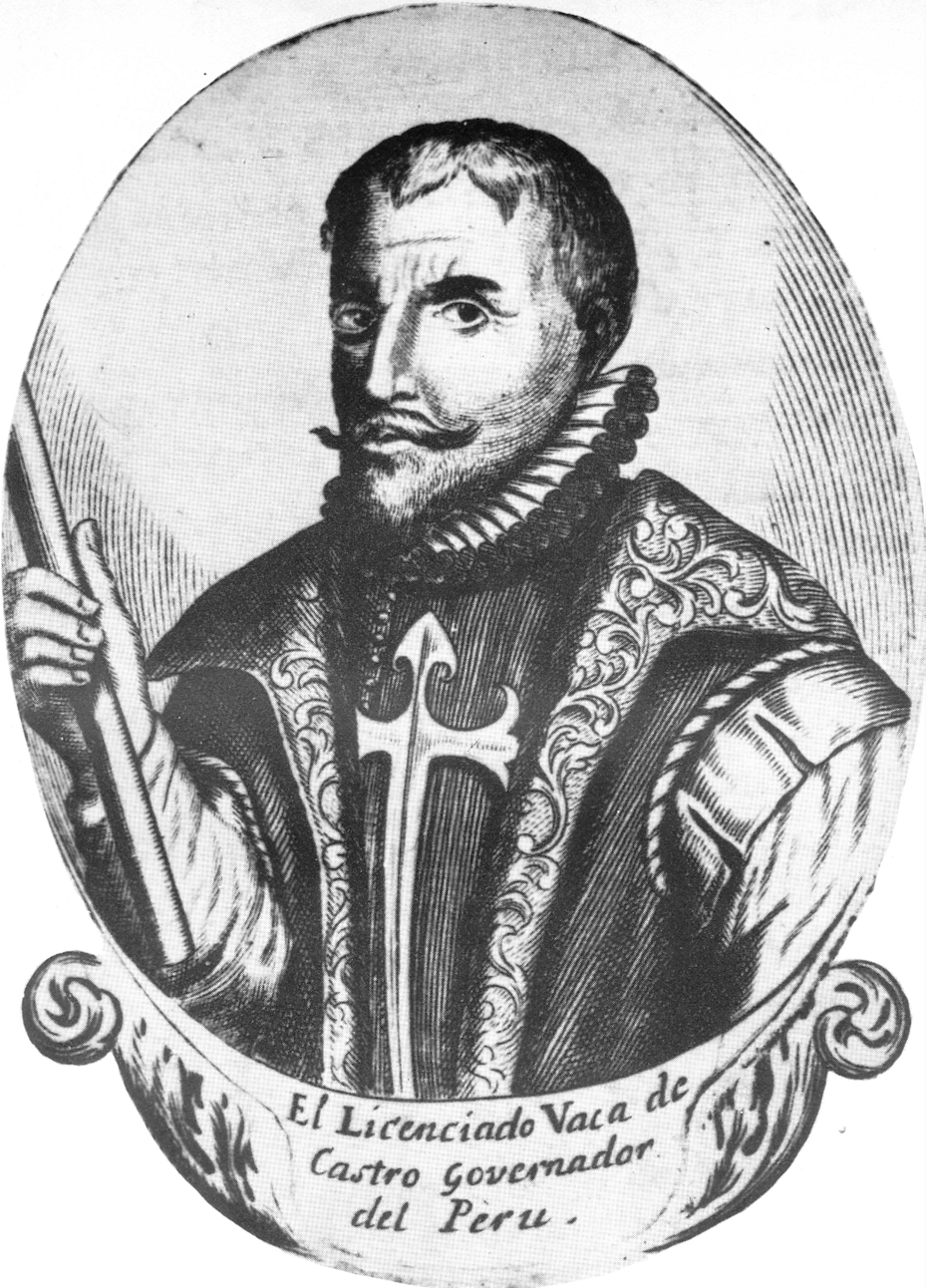

2nd Governor of New Castile
- In office August 7, 1542 – May 17, 1544
- Monarch: Charles V
- Preceded by: Francisco Pizarro
- Succeeded by: Blasco Núñez Vela

Personal details
- Born: c. 1492 Izagre, León, Crown of Castille
- Died: 1566 Valladolid, Spain
- Profession: Politician

Cristóbal Vaca de Castro (c. 1492, Izagre, León, Spain – 1566, Valladolid, Spain) was a Spanish colonial administrator in Peru.

== Background ==
Vaca de Castro's parents were Garci Diez de Castro and Guiomar Cabeza de Vaca. He studied law in Salamanca. He married María Magdalena de Quiñones y Osorio, and had eight children with her. In 1536 he was named oidor (judge) in the Royal Audiencia of Valladolid. On September 9, 1540 he was named a knight of the Order of Santiago.

== The road to Peru ==
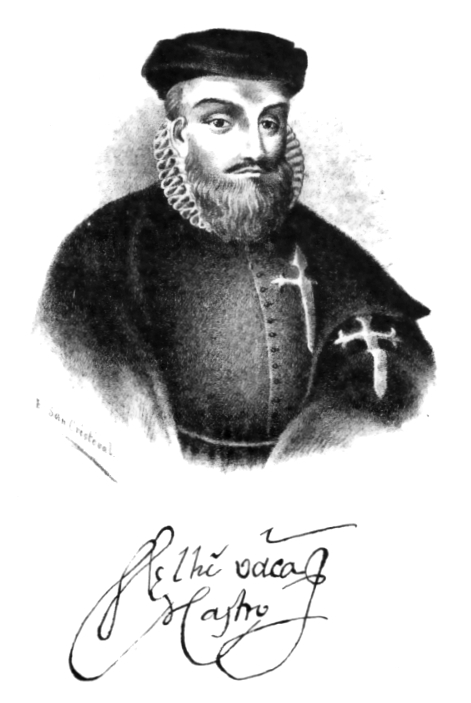
Cristóbal Vaca de Castro, by Evaristo San Cristóval, 1891

In 1540 he was sent by Emperor Charles V to restore order between the factions of Gonzalo Pizarro and Diego Almagro the Younger after the assassination of Diego de Almagro the Elder. Vaca de Castro had a reputation as a man of integrity, sagacity, and courage. His official title was juez pesquisidor (special investigator). He was authorized to take over the government of the colony in the event of the death of Francisco Pizarro.

He sailed from Sanlúcar de Barrameda on November 5, 1540, and arrived in Panama in January 1541. While he was there, he reformed the Audiencia, as its president. He sailed for Peru, but was forced by bad weather to land at Buenaventura (Colombia). He proceeded from Buenaventura by land to Cali, where he remained three months because of illness. While in Cali, he mediated in a jurisdictional dispute between Sebastián de Belalcázar and Pascual de Andagoya.

== As governor of Peru ==
Still on the road to Peru, in Popayán he learned of the assassination of Francisco Pizarro and the election of Diego de Almagro as governor. He arrived in Quito on September 25, 1541, where he united the royalist forces behind him.

Having made himself governor of the colony, he raised a considerable number of troops. Supported by Francisco de Carvajal, he defeated Almagro on September 16, 1542 in the plains of Chupas. Almagro tried to flee after the defeat, but was taken prisoner. Pressured by the Pizarristas, Vaca de Castro ordered his execution.

The New Laws were passed in 1542. They were intended to ban the most obvious abuses of the encomienda system, and eventually abolish the system altogether. The New Laws caused difficulty for Vaca de Castro with Gonzalo Pizarro and other supporters of the old system. Vaca de Castro agreed to present their case to the Crown. Thereafter he concentrated his efforts on developing the country, through improving the means of communication, regulating the inns for cross-country travel, and overseeing the use of labor in the mines.

In 1543 he sent Diego de Rojas and 200 men to the Río de la Plata. The discovery of Tucumán is credited to this expedition.

== Return to Spain ==
He was succeeded by the first viceroy of Peru, Blasco Núñez Vela, in 1544. Núñez Vela had him arrested on charges of sympathizing with the rebellion of Gonzalo Pizarro. He was imprisoned in El Callao, then sent by ship to Panama, and then on to Spain. In Spain, he was imprisoned on charges of illegal enrichment, but after three years in prison he was cleared of the charges. Later he was named commander of the Order of Santiago. He was president of the Council of Castile between 1557 and 1561.

He retired to the convent of San Agustín in Valladolid, where he died in 1566. He was interred in the convent.

Government offices
Preceded by Francisco Pizarro	Governor of New Castile; 1541–1544	Succeeded by Blasco Núñez Vela
