= Rodrigo Orgóñez =

Spanish captain and explorer (1490–1538)

Rodrigo Orgóñez (1490 – 26 April 1538) was a Spanish captain under Diego de Almagro, a conquistador known for his exploits in western South America.

Born in Oropesa, Rodrigo participated in the Italian Campaigns. He accompanied Francisco de Godoy from Nicaragua when they joined Diego's men in reinforcing Pizarro during the Spanish conquest of the Inca Empire.

He proved his loyalty serving as a soldier for 5 years before he was made second in command to conquer and govern the southern portion of the Incan Empire. He helped Almagro in his 1537 coup d'état in Cusco, leading the group that surrounded the Amaru Cancha Palace capturing Hernando Pizarro and Gonzalo Pizarro. He later led an army against the Pizarros but was killed in 1538 during the Battle of Las Salinas.

American historian William H. Prescott wrote: "Thus perished as loyal a cavalier, as decided in council, and as bold in action, as ever crossed to the shores of America."

== See also ==
- Battle of Abancay
