= Battle of Chupas =

Battle that took place during the Spanish conquest of Peru

- Part of the Spanish conquest of Peru
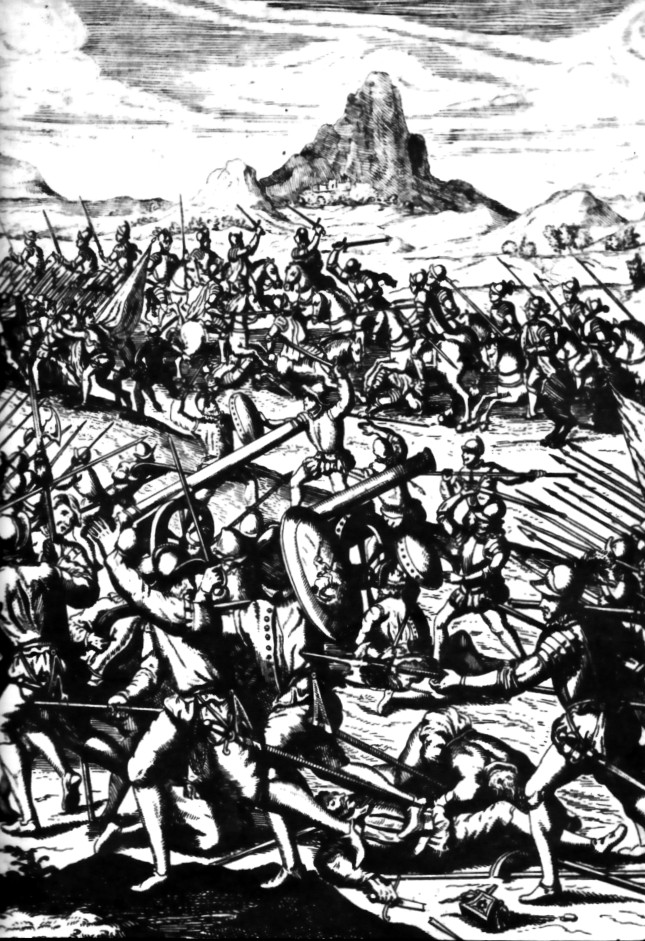
- Battle of Chupas
Date	16 September 1542
Location	Chupas, near Huamanga, present-day Peru 13.2539°S 74.22566°W
Result	Victory for Nueva Castilla

Belligerents
Spanish Empire; Nueva Castilla	Nueva Toledo; Almagristas Rebels

Commanders and leaders
Cristóbal Vaca de Castro; Francisco de Carvajal; Alonso de Alvarado	Diego de Almagro II (POW); Gómez de Alvarado

Strength
Unknown	Unknown

Casualties and losses
Unknown	At least 200 Almagristas

After the assassination of Francisco Pizarro, in retaliation for his father's execution in 1538, Diego de Almagro II, El Mozo, continued to press claims as the rightful ruler of Peru and as leader of his father's supporters. His claims were largely unsuccessful, however, as Pizarro was succeeded as governor by Cristóbal Vaca de Castro, despite claims from his brother Gonzalo Pizarro, whose claims to join arms against the Almagristas and "El Mozo" largely remained unanswered.

== Battle ==
Desperate not to face the same fate as his father after the battle of Las Salinas, Diego de Almagro II gathered an army of supporters. Vaca de Castro met and defeated de Almagro's army outside Huamanga (Ayacucho) at Chupas, on 16 September 1542, the year following Pizarro's murder. 1200 Spaniards fought in the battle. Vaca de Castro's forces killed 200 Almagristas, and hanged many more later that day. De Almagro fled to Cuzco and tried to seek refuge at Manco Inca's residence in Vitcos. But he was caught on September 16, 1542 and was executed on the city plaza of Cuzco after a brief trial.
