= Izagre =

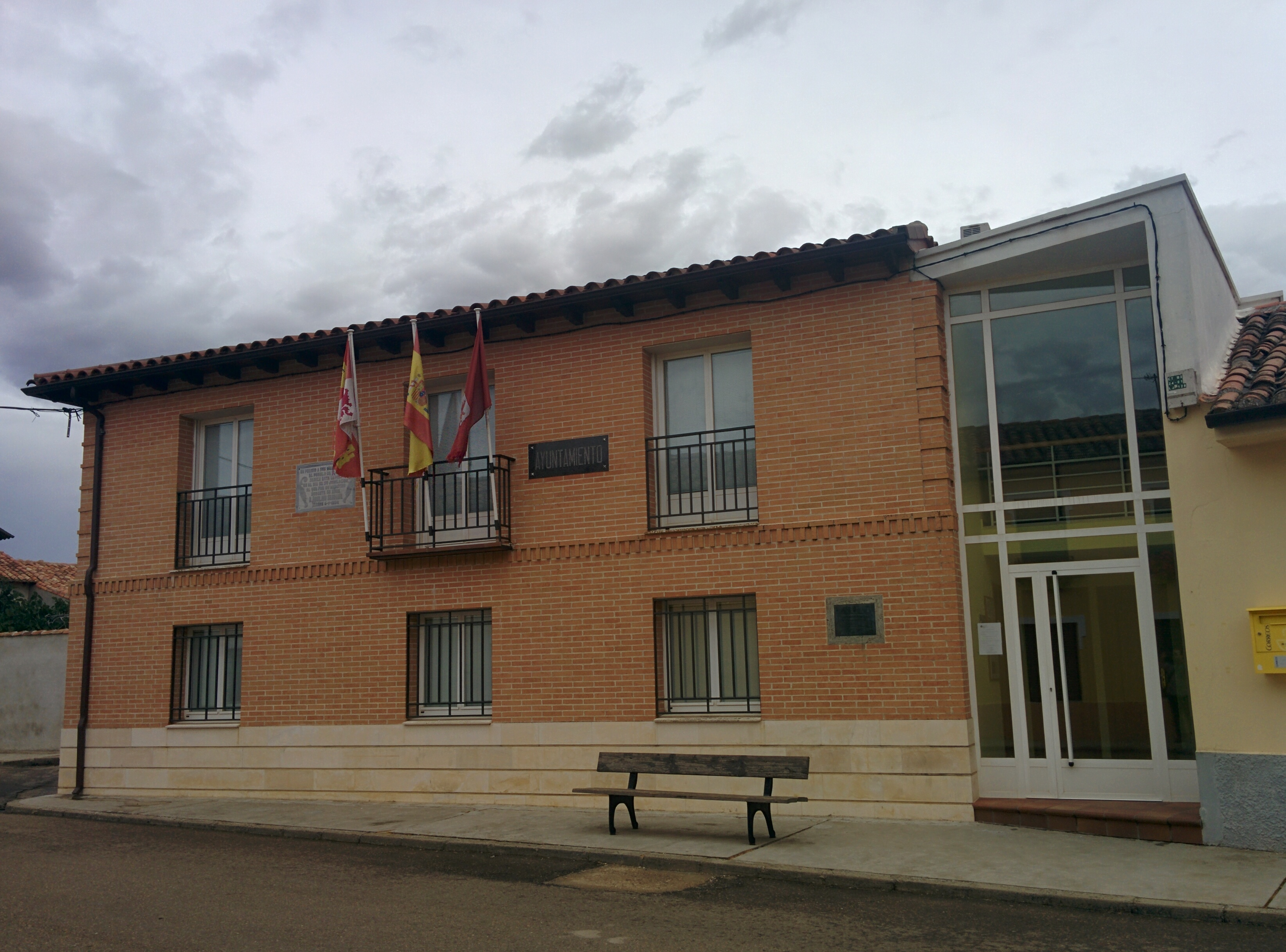
- Town hall

- Flag Coat of arms

- Location within Spain
- Coordinates: 42°13′27″N 5°15′26″W
- Country: Spain
- Autonomous community: Castile and León
- Province: León
- Municipality: Izagre

Government
  - Mayor: Enrique Santervás Paniagua (PSOE)

Area
  - Total: 44.23 km^{2} (17.08 sq mi)
- Elevation: 782 m (2,566 ft)

Population (2025-01-01)
  - Total: 133
  - Density: 3.01/km^{2} (7.79/sq mi)
- Time zone: UTC+1 (CET)
  - Summer (DST): UTC+2 (CEST)
- Postal Code: 24293
- Telephone prefix: 987
- Climate: Cfb

Izagre (Spanish pronunciation: [iˈθaɣɾe]) is a village and municipality located in the province of León, Castile and León, Spain.

== Population ==
According to the 2010 census (INE), the municipality has a population of 214 inhabitants.

== Villages ==
Izagre's municipality has three villages:

- Albires
- Izagre
- Valdemorilla
