= Amable-Paul Coutan =

French painter

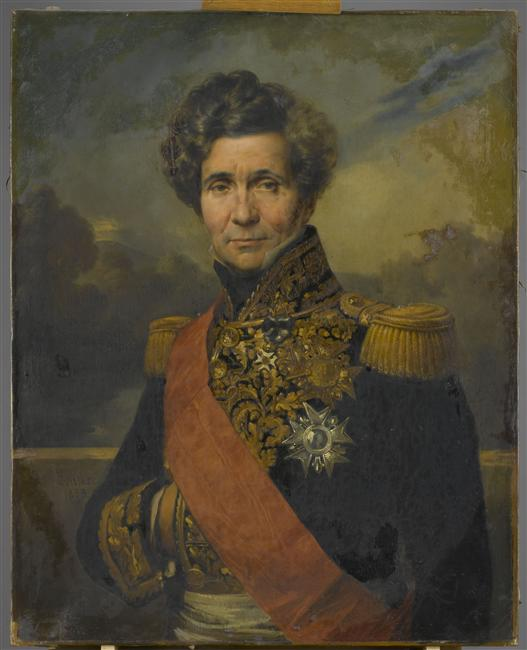
Portrait of Louis-François Coutard

Amable-Paul Coutan (1792–1837) was a French historical painter.

== Life ==
Coutan was born in Paris in 1792. He studied under Gros, and obtaining the Academy pension was thus enabled later on to improve himself at Rome. Returning to his native country he produced works, representing chiefly classical and mythological subjects, which realized considerable prices. He took a part also in the labour of decorating with religious subjects the church of Notre-Dame-de-Lorette. He died in Paris in 1837.
