= Diego de Almagro II =

Son of Spanish conquistador Diego de Almagro

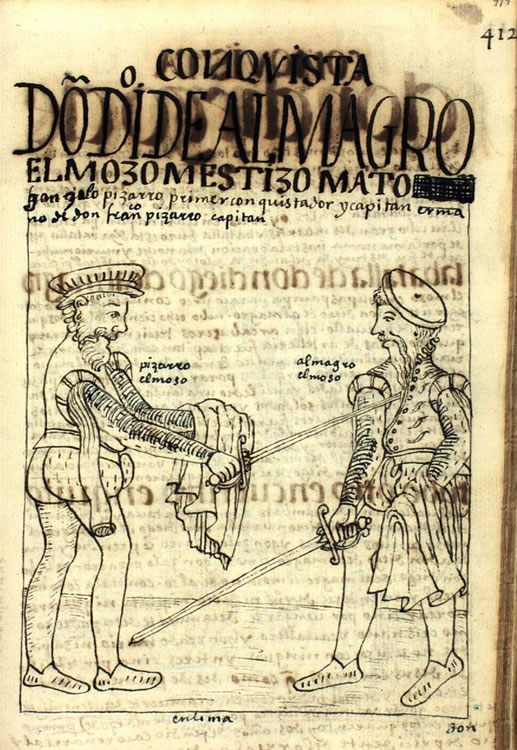
- Diego de Almagro (right)
- Born: c. 1520; Panama, Kingdoms of the Indies
- Died: September 16, 1542 (aged 21–22); Lima, New Castile
- Father: Diego de Almagro

Diego de Almagro II (1520 – September 16, 1542), called El Mozo (the boy), was the son of Spanish conquistador Diego de Almagro and Ana Martínez, a native Panamanian woman. He was however raised, at least partly, by Malgarida who was an emancipated African slave in service of Diego de Almagro.

== Peru ==
In 1531 El Mozo accompanied his father on the expedition to Peru, which encompassed the north of the Inca Empire. Together with his father, they led about 100 Spanish soldiers while Francisco Pizarro, the leader of the expedition, went south, capturing the Sapa Inca Atahualpa in a surprise attack, the so-called Battle of Cajamarca.

El Mozo and his father, Diego, went to Cajamarca in 1533, but they received no gold for the capture and pressed to get the Incas executed, which finally happened on July 26. Almagro then accompanied Pizarro to Cuzco and conquered the Inca capital. In 1535, he then went south in a large expedition to Chile while Pizarro founded Ciudad de los Reyes (City of the Kings, today Lima). In 1536, Manco Inca besieged Cuzco with 100,000 Inca warriors. Almagro returned from Chile, drove them away, and seized power in Cuzco in 1537. Almagro imprisoned Hernando Pizarro and his younger brother, Gonzalo, but aware that Francisco Pizarro was organizing an army to march on Cuzco, he released Hernando in an effort to resolve the conflict. Gonzalo, meanwhile, managed to escape. Together, the brothers returned with an army and defeated the Almagrists. Diego Almagro (the elder) was summarily executed by Hernando, an act that would later have significant repercussions for Hernando when he returned to Spain, being thrown into a Spanish prison for 20 years for executing a noble without royal consent.

== Revenge ==
El Mozo swore to avenge his father and on June 26, 1541, his followers managed to get into Pizarro's palace in Lima and established a coup d'état in which Francisco Pizarro died in battle. Francisco had woken up and killed two of the assassins, but while struggling to get his breastplate on, was stabbed in the throat. Francisco fell to the floor, made a cross with his own blood, and cried out for help from Jesus Christ. After Pizarro's death, El Mozo was named governor by the conspirators but after failing to be accepted as such he fled to Cuzco with his supporters. He was eventually defeated and captured on September 16, 1542 in the Battle of Chupas by the troops of Cristóbal Vaca de Castro, who had succeeded Pizarro as governor; El Mozo was executed at the city square after a brief trial.
