= Hernando de Luque =

Spanish priest

Hernando de Luque (Unknown – 1533) was a Spanish priest who travelled to the New World in the 16th century. Luque was born in Olvera, Andalusia, but grew up in Luque, Spain. His last name comes from his town being Luque. His English name is Ferdinand of Luque. Luque left for the Americas in 1514. He arrived in 1514 with the expedition of Pedrarias Dávila to Panama, where he met Francisco Pizarro. He later met Vazquez who helped him in the conversion of the Incas.

Luque acted as an agent for the financial backer, Judge Gaspar de Espinosa, of the joint expedition by Francisco Pizarro and Diego de Almagro to Peru in 1526. He was named "Bishop of Tumbes" and "Protector of the Indians" in the Capitulation of 1529.

In 1533, Hernando de Luque died in Panama.
