= Francisco Pizarro =

Spanish conquistador (1478–1541)

Francisco Pizarro Order of Santiago
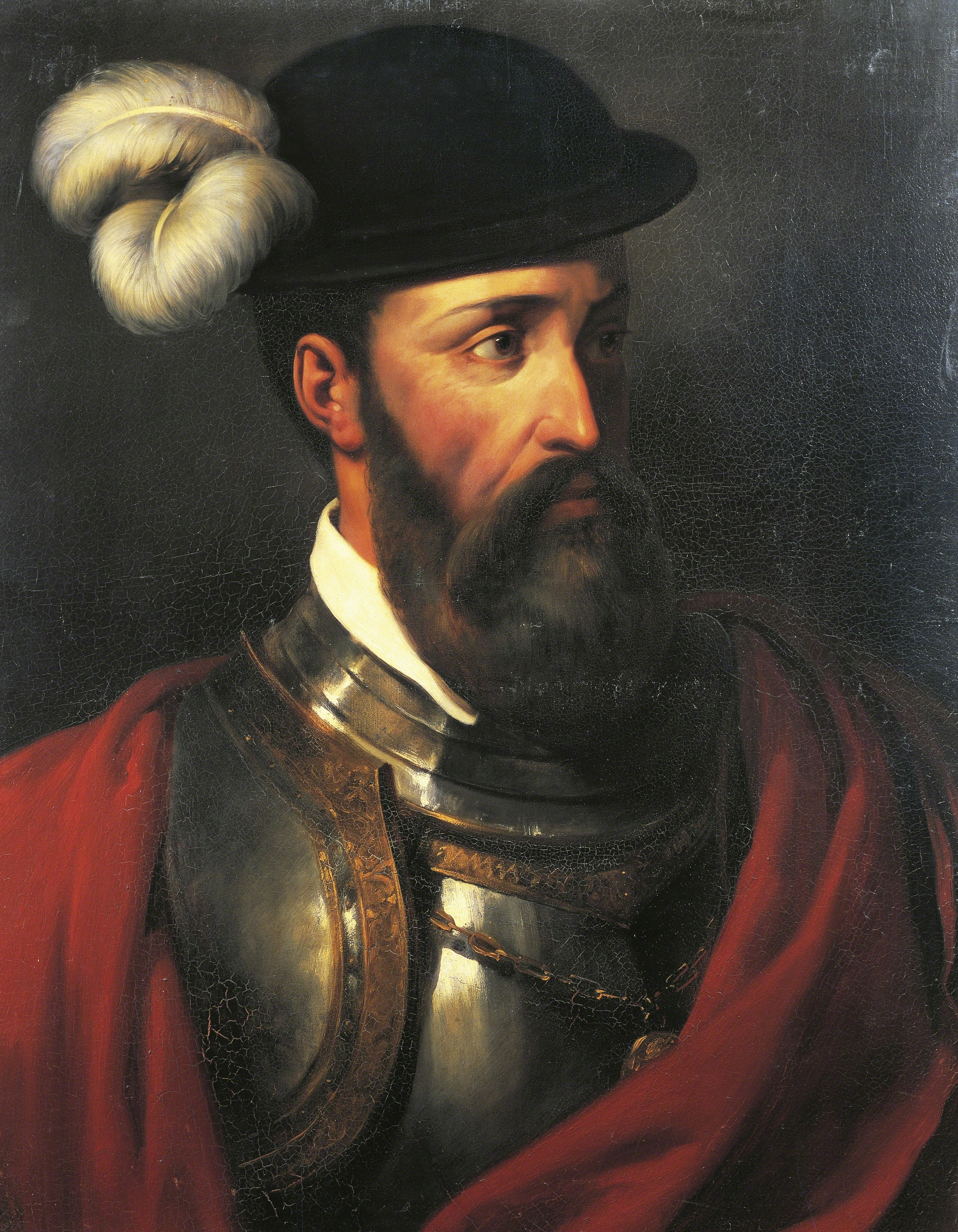
- Portrait by Amable-Paul Coutan, 1835

1st Governor of New Castile
- In office 26 July 1529 – 26 June 1541
- Monarch: Charles I
- Succeeded by: Cristóbal Vaca de Castro

Captain General of New Castile
- In office 26 July 1529 – 26 June 1541

Personal details
- Born: Francisco Pizarro y González c. 1478 Trujillo, Crown of Castile
- Died: 26 June 1541 Government Palace, Lima, New Castile, Spanish empire (present day Peru)
- Cause of death: Assassination (stab wounds)
- Resting place: Metropolitan Cathedral of Lima, Lima, Peru
- Spouse: Inés Huaylas Yupanqui
- Children: Francisca Pizarro Yupanqui
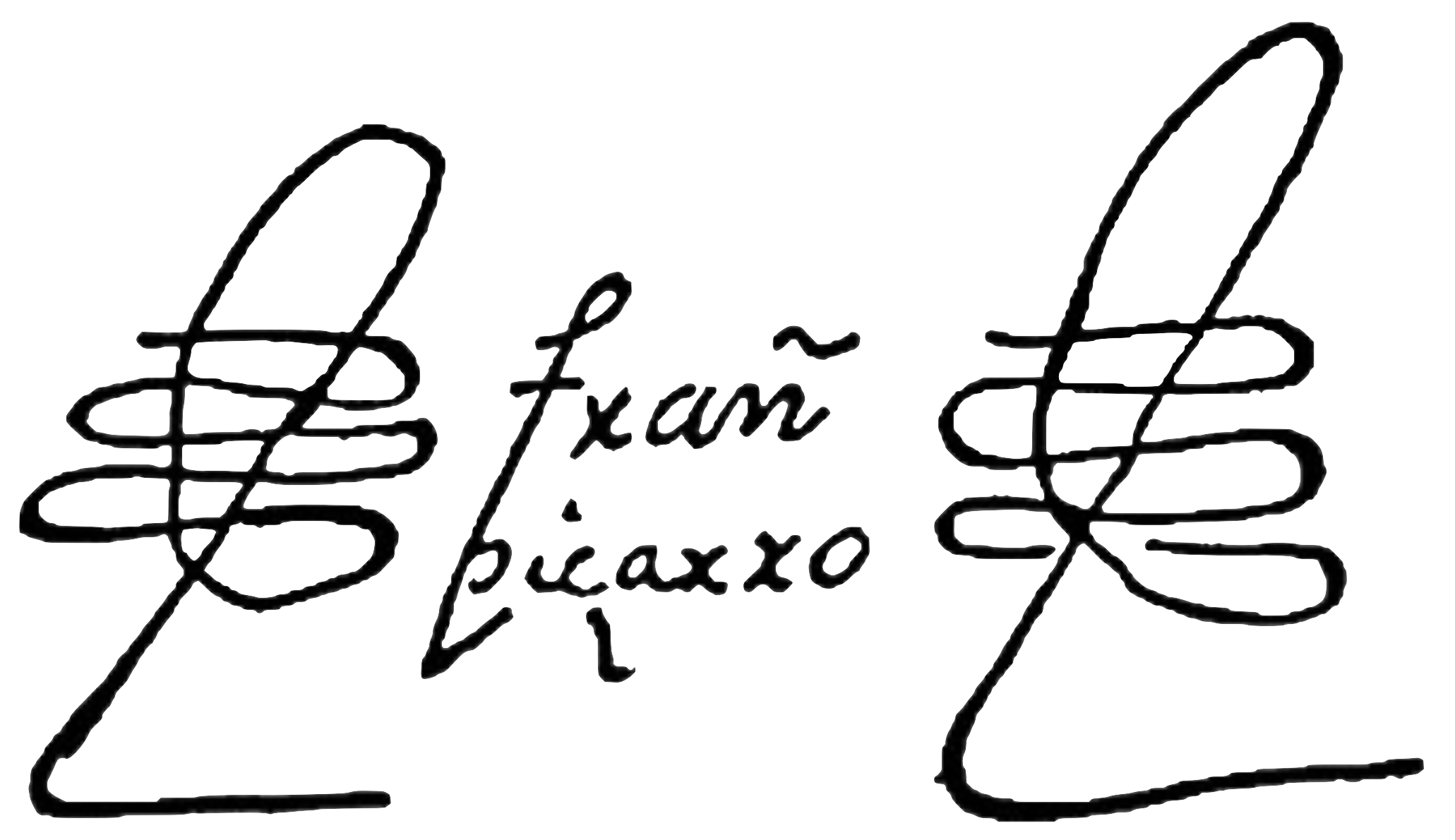
- Signature
- Nickname: Apu ('chief' in Quechua) or Machu Capitan ('Old Captain' in Quechua)

Military service
- Allegiance: Spanish Empire
- Years of service: 1496–1541
- Battles/wars: Conflicts: Spanish Conquest of the Inca Empire; Battle of Punta Quemada; Battle of Puná; Battle of the Mangroves; Battle of Cajamarca; First Battle of Jauja; Battle of Vilcaconga; Battle of Cusco; Siege of Lima

Francisco Pizarro, 1st Marquess of the Conquest (/pɪˈzɑːroʊ/; Spanish: [fɾanˈθisko piˈθaro]; c. 1478 – 26 June 1541), was a Spanish conquistador, best known for his expeditions that led to the Spanish conquest of the Inca Empire.

Born in Trujillo, Spain, to a poor family of pig farmers, Pizarro chose to pursue fortune and adventure in the New World. He went to the Gulf of Urabá and accompanied Vasco Núñez de Balboa in his crossing of the Isthmus of Panama, where they became the first Europeans to see the Pacific Ocean from the Americas. He served as mayor of the newly founded Panama City for a few years and undertook two failed expeditions to Peru. In 1529, Pizarro obtained permission from the Crown of Castile to lead a campaign to conquer Peru and went on his third, and successful, expedition.

When Peru was found in a vulnerable state of civil war, Pizarro moved inland and founded the first Spanish settlement in Peru, San Miguel de Piura. After a series of manoeuvres that heavily relied on the Spanish guns and cavalry, Pizarro captured the Inca emperor Atahualpa at the Battle of Cajamarca in November 1532. A ransom for the emperor's release was demanded and Atahualpa filled a room with gold to the highest point he could reach, but Pizarro charged him with various crimes and executed him by garrotting in July 1533. The same year, Pizarro entered the Inca capital of Cuzco and completed his conquest of Peru. In January 1535, he founded the city of Lima, and in 1537 he was created the 1st Marquess of the Conquest (Spanish: Marqués de la Conquista) by the Crown of Castile. Pizarro eventually fell victim to political power struggles and was assassinated in 1541.

== Early life ==
Francisco Pizarro was born in Trujillo, Spain (then in the Crown of Castile, modern-day Extremadura). He was the illegitimate son of infantry colonel Gonzalo Pizarro (1446–1522) and Francisca González, a woman of poor means. His date of birth is uncertain, but it is believed to be sometime in the 1470s, probably 1475. Little attention was paid to his education and he grew up, and remained, illiterate.

His father served in Navarre and in the Italian campaigns under Córdoba. His mother married late in life and had a son, Francisco Martín de Alcántara, who was at the conquest of Peru with his half-brother from its inception. Through his father, Francisco was a second cousin, once removed, of Hernán Cortés.

== Early career as Conquistador ==
On 10 November 1509, Pizarro sailed from Spain to the New World with Alonso de Ojeda on an expedition to Urabá. Pizarro became a participant in Ojeda's failed colony, commanding the remnants until he abandoned it with the survivors. He sailed to Cartagena and joined the fleet of Martín Fernández de Enciso and, in 1513, accompanied Balboa in his crossing of the Isthmus of Panama to the Pacific. The following year, Pedro Arias Dávila became the newly appointed governor of Castilla de Oro and succeeded Balboa. During the next five years, Pizarro became a close associate of Dávila and the governor assigned him a repartimiento of natives and cattle. When Dávila decided to get rid of Balboa out of distrust, he instructed Pizarro to personally arrest him and bring him to stand trial. Balboa was beheaded in January 1519. For his loyalty to Dávila, Pizarro was rewarded with the positions of mayor (Alcalde) and magistrate of the then recently founded Panama City from 1519 to 1523.

== Expeditions to South America ==
The first attempt to explore western South America was undertaken in 1522 by Pascual de Andagoya. The South American Indians he encountered told him about a gold-rich territory called Virú, which was on a river called Pirú (from which we get the pronunciation Perú). These reports were relayed by the Spanish-Inca mestizo writer named Garcilaso de la Vega in Comentarios Reales de los Incas (1608).

Andagoya eventually established contact with several Native American curacas (chiefs), some of whom he later claimed were sorcerers and witches. Having reached as far as the San Juan River (part of the present boundary between Ecuador and Colombia) Andagoya fell ill and returned to Panama. He spread the news and stories about "Pirú" – a great land to the south rich with gold (the legendary El Dorado). These revelations, along with the accounts for Cortés' success in Mexico, caught the attention of Pizarro, prompting a series of expeditions to the south.

In 1524, while he was still in Panama, Pizarro formed a partnership with a priest, Hernando de Luque and a soldier, Diego de Almagro, to explore and conquer the South. Pizarro, Almagro and Luque later explicitly renewed their compact, agreeing to conquer and divide equally among themselves the empire they hoped to vanquish. While their accord was strictly oral, they dubbed their enterprise the Empresa del Levante and determined that Pizarro would command the expedition, Almagro would provide military and food supplies and Luque would be in charge of finances and additional provisions.

=== First expedition (1524) ===
In November 1524, the first of three expeditions left Panama for the conquest of Peru with about 80 men and four horses. Juan de Salcedo was the standard bearer, Nicolás de Ribera was the treasurer and Juan Carvallo was the inspector.

Diego de Almagro was left behind because he was to recruit men, gather additional supplies and join Pizarro later. The Governor of Panama, Pedro Arias Dávila, at first approved in principle the exploration of South America. Pizarro's first expedition, however, turned out to be a failure as his conquistadors, sailing down the Pacific coast, reached no further than Colombia before succumbing to bad weather, lack of food and skirmishes with hostile natives, one of which caused Almagro to lose an eye by arrow-shot. The place names the Spanish bestowed along their route, including Puerto Deseado (desired port), Puerto del Hambre (port of hunger) and Punta Quemado or Puebla Quemado (burned port), confirmed their difficulties. Fearing subsequent hostile encounters like the one the expedition endured at the Battle of Punta Quemada, Pizarro ended his first expedition and returned to Panama.

=== Second expedition (1526) ===
Two years later Pizarro, Almagro and Luque started the arrangements for a second expedition with permission from Pedro Arias Dávila, Panama's governor. Dávila, who himself was preparing an expedition north to Nicaragua, was reluctant to permit another expedition, having lost confidence in Pizarro. The three associates eventually won his trust and he acquiesced. By this time, a new governor was to arrive and succeed Dávila. Pedro de los Ríos took charge as the new colonial administrator in July 1526 and initially approved Pizarro's expeditions (he would join him several years later in Peru).

On 10 March 1526, Pizarro left Panama with two ships with 160 men and several horses, reaching as far as the Colombian San Juan River. Soon after arriving the party separated, with Pizarro staying to explore the new and often perilous territory off the swampy Colombian coasts, while the expedition's co-commander, Almagro, returned to Panama for reinforcements. Pizarro's Piloto Mayor (main pilot), Bartolomé Ruiz, continued sailing south and, after crossing the equator, found and captured a balsa (raft) under sail, with natives from Tumbes. To everyone's surprise, these carried textiles - made of a new plant called cotton, ceramic objects and some pieces of gold, silver and emeralds, making Ruiz's findings the central focus of this second expedition. Some natives were taken aboard Ruiz's ship to serve as interpreters.

He then set sail north for the San Juan River, arriving to find Pizarro and his men exhausted from the difficulties they had faced exploring the new territory. Soon, Almagro sailed into the port laden with supplies and a reinforcement of at least eighty recruits who had arrived at Panama from Spain with an expeditionary spirit. The findings and excellent news from Ruiz along with Almagro's new reinforcements cheered Pizarro and his tired followers. They decided to sail back to the territory already explored by Ruiz and, after a difficult voyage due to strong winds and currents, reached Atacames on the Ecuadorian coast. Here, they found a large native population recently brought under Inca rule. Unfortunately for the conquistadores, the people they encountered seemed so defiant and numerous that the Spanish decided not to enter the land.

==== The Famous Thirteen ====
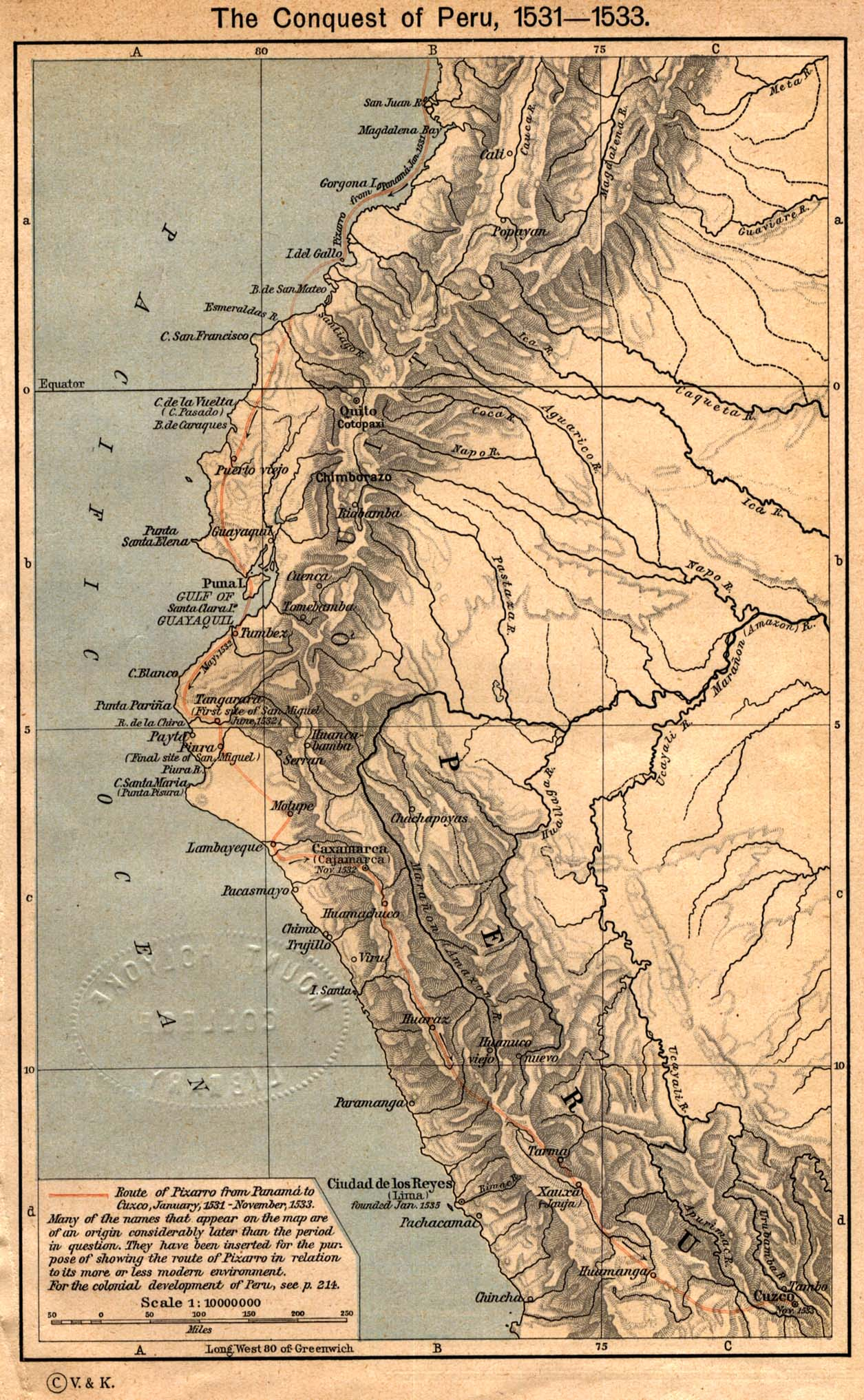
Francisco Pizarro's route of exploration during the conquest of Peru (1531–1533)

After much wrangling between Pizarro and Almagro, it was decided that Pizarro would stay at a safer place, the Isla de Gallo, near the coast, while Almagro would return to Panama with Luque for more reinforcements – this time with proof of the gold they had found and the news of the discovery of the obviously wealthy land they had explored. The new governor of Panama, Pedro de los Ríos, had learned of the mishaps of Pizarro's expeditions and the deaths of various settlers who had gone with him. Fearing an unsuccessful outcome, he rejected Almagro's application for continued resources. In addition, he ordered two ships commanded by Juan Tafur to be sent immediately with the intention of bringing Pizarro and his crew back to Panama.

Pizarro had no intention of returning and when Tafur arrived at Isla de Gallo, Pizarro drew a line in the sand, saying: "There lies Peru with its riches; Here, Panama and its poverty. Choose, each man, what best becomes a brave Castilian. For my part, I go to the south."

Only 13 men stayed with Pizarro. They later became known as "The Famous Thirteen" (Los trece de la fama), while the rest of the expeditioners stayed with Tafur. Ruiz left in one of the ships with the intention of joining Almagro and Luque in their efforts to gather reinforcements. Soon after the ships left, Pizarro and his men constructed a crude boat and journeyed 25 leagues north to La Isla Gorgona, where they would remain for seven months before the arrival of new provisions.

Back in Panama, Pedro de los Ríos (after much convincing by Luque) had finally acquiesced to the requests for another ship, but only to bring Pizarro back within six months and completely abandon the expedition. Almagro and Luque grasped the opportunity and left Panama (this time without new recruits) for La Isla Gorgona to join Pizarro once again. On meeting Pizarro, the associates decided to continue sailing south on the recommendations of Ruiz's Indian interpreters.

By April 1528, they finally reached the northwestern Peruvian Tumbes Region. Tumbes became the first success that the Spanish had so long desired. They were received with a warm welcome of hospitality and provisions from the Tumpis, the local inhabitants. On subsequent days two of Pizarro's men, Alonso de Molina and Pedro de Candia, reconnoitred the territory and both, on separate accounts, reported back the riches of the land, including the decorations of silver and gold around the chief's residence and the hospitable attentions with which they were received by everyone. The Spanish also saw for the first time the Peruvian llama, which Pizarro called "little camels". Pizarro continued receiving the same accounts of a powerful monarch who ruled over the land they were exploring. These events served as evidence to convince the expedition that the wealth and power displayed at Tumbes were an example of the riches of the Peruvian territory. The conquistadors decided to return to Panama to prepare the final expedition of conquest with more recruits and provisions. Before leaving, however, Pizarro and his followers sailed south along the coast to see if anything of interest could be found. Historian William H. Prescott recounts that after passing through territories they named such as Cabo Blanco, port of Payta, Sechura, Punta de Aguja, Santa Cruz and Trujillo (founded by Almagro years later), they finally reached for the first time the ninth degree of the southern latitude in South America.

On their return towards Panama, Pizarro briefly stopped at Tumbes, where two of his men had decided to stay to learn the customs and language of the natives. Pizarro was also given two Peruvian boys to learn Spanish, one of whom was later baptised as Felipillo and served as an important interpreter, the equivalent of Cortés' La Malinche of Mexico, and another called Martinillo. Their final stop was at La Isla Gorgona, where two of his invalid men (one had died) had been left behind. After at least 18 months away, Pizarro and his followers anchored off the coasts of Panama to prepare for the final expedition.

=== Capitulation of Toledo ===
The Governorate of New Castile was given to Francisco Pizarro.

When the new governor of Panama, Pedro de los Ríos, refused permission for a third expedition to the south, the associates resolved that Pizarro should leave for Spain and appeal to the sovereign in person. Pizarro sailed from Panama for Spain in the spring of 1528, accompanied by Pedro de Candia, some natives and llamas, plus samples of fabric, gold and silver.

Pizarro reached Seville in early summer. King Charles I, who was at Toledo, had an interview with Pizarro and heard of his expeditions in South America. The conquistador described the territory as rich in gold and silver that he and his followers had bravely explored "to extend the empire of Castile". The king, who was soon to leave for Italy, was impressed at his accounts and promised his support for the conquest of Peru. Queen Isabel, though, in the absence of the king, signed the Capitulación de Toledo on 6 July 1529, a licence document that authorised Pizarro to proceed with the conquest of Peru. Pizarro was officially named the Governor, Captain general, Adelantado and Alguacil Mayor, of New Castile for the distance of 200 leagues along the newly discovered coast and invested with all authority and prerogatives, leaving his associates in secondary positions (a fact that later incensed Almagro and would lead to eventual discord). One of the grant conditions was that within six months, Pizarro should raise a sufficiently equipped force of 250 men, of whom 100 might be drawn from the colonies.

This gave Pizarro time to leave for his native Trujillo and convince his brother Hernando Pizarro and other close friends to join him on his third expedition. Francisco de Orellana joined the group and would later discover and explore the length of the Amazon River. Two half-brothers on his father's side, Juan Pizarro and Gonzalo Pizarro, and a half-brother from his mother, Francisco Martín de Alcántara, later also decided to join him, as well as his cousin Pedro Pizarro, who served as his page. When the expedition left the following year, it numbered three ships, 180 men and 27 horses.

Pizarro could not raise the number of men the Capitulación required and sailed clandestinely from the port of Sanlúcar de Barrameda for the Canary Island of La Gomera in January 1530. He was joined there by his brother Hernando and the remaining men in two vessels that would sail back to Panama. Pizarro's third and final expedition left Panama for Peru on 27 December 1530.

=== Conquest of Peru (1532) ===
Pizarro and his followers in Lima in 1535

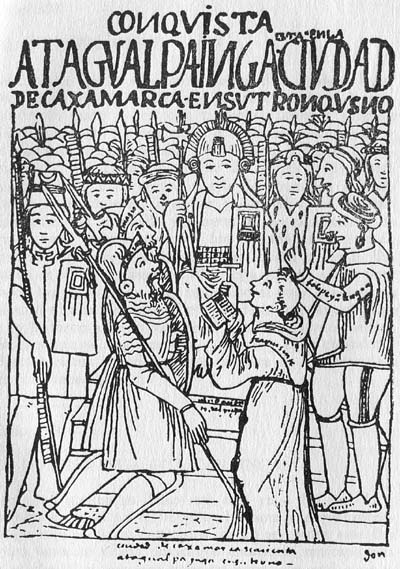
Pizarro meets with the Inca Emperor Atahualpa, 1532

In 1531, Pizarro once again landed on the coasts near Ecuador, the province of Coaque and the region of esmeraldas, where some gold, silver and emeralds were procured and then dispatched to Almagro. The latter had stayed in Panama to gather more recruits. Sebastián de Belalcázar soon arrived with 30 men. Though Pizarro's main objective was then to set sail and dock at Tumbes as during his previous expedition, he was forced to confront the Punian natives in the Battle of Puná, leaving three or four Spaniards dead and many wounded. Soon after, Hernando de Soto, another conquistador who had joined the expedition, arrived with 100 volunteers and horses to aid Pizarro and with him sailed towards Tumbes, only to find the place deserted and destroyed. The two conquistadors suspected that the settlers had disappeared or died under murky circumstances. The chiefs explained that the fierce tribes of Punians had attacked them and ransacked the place.

As Tumbes no longer afforded safe accommodations, Pizarro led an excursion into the hinterland in May 1532 and established the first Spanish settlement in Peru, San Miguel de Piura, and a repartimiento.

Leaving 50 men back at the settlement under the command of Antonio Navarro, Pizarro proceeded with his conquest accompanied by 200 men on 24 September 1532. After arriving at Zaran, de Soto was dispatched to a Peruvian garrison at Caxas. After a week, he returned with an envoy from the Inca himself, with presents and an invitation to visit the Inca ruler's camp.

Following the defeat of his brother, Huáscar, in the Inca Civil War, Atahualpa had been resting in the Sierra of northern Peru, near Cajamarca, in the nearby thermal baths known today as the Inca Baths. Arriving at Cajamarca on 15 November 1532, Pizarro had a force of just 110-foot soldiers, 67 cavalry, three arquebuses and two falconets. He sent Hernando Pizarro and de Soto to an audience with Atahualpa in his camp. Atahualpa agreed to meet Pizarro in his Cajamarca plaza fortress the next day. Friar Vincente de Valverde and native interpreter Felipillo approached Atahualpa in Cajamarca's central plaza. After the Dominican friar expounded the "true faith" and the need to pay tribute to the Emperor Charles V, Atahualpa replied, "I shall be no man's tributary." His complacency, because fewer than 200 Spanish remained, as opposed to his 50,000-man army, of which 6,000 accompanied him to Cajamarca, sealed his fate and that of the Inca empire.

Atahualpa's refusal led Pizarro and his force to attack the Inca army in what became the Battle of Cajamarca on 16 November 1532. The Spanish were successful. Pizarro executed Atahualpa's 12-man honour guard and took the Inca captive at the so-called Ransom Room. By February 1533, Almagro had joined Pizarro in Cajamarca with an additional 150 men and 50 horses.

Despite fulfilling his promise of filling one room (22 by 17 feet or 7 by 5 metres) with gold and two with silver, Atahualpa was convicted of 12 charges, including killing his brother and plotting against Pizarro and his forces. He was executed by garrote on 29 August 1533. Francisco Pizarro and de Soto were opposed to Atahualpa's execution, but Francisco consented to the trial due to the "great agitation among the soldiers", particularly by Almagro. De Soto was on a reconnaissance mission the day of the trial and execution and upon his return expressed his dismay, stating, "he should have been taken to Castile and judged by the emperor." King Charles later wrote to Pizarro: "We have been displeased by the death of Atahualpa, since he was a monarch and particularly as it was done in the name of justice."

Pizarro advanced with his army of 500 Spaniards toward Cuzco, accompanied by Chalcuchimac, one of the leading Inca generals of the north and a supporter of Atahualpa, who was subsequently burned at the stake. Manco Inca Yupanqui joined Pizarro after the death of Túpac Huallpa. During the exploration of Cuzco, Pizarro was impressed and through his officers wrote back to Spain to King Charles, saying: "This city is the greatest and the finest ever seen in this country or anywhere in the Indies... We can assure your Majesty that it is so beautiful and has such fine buildings that it would be remarkable even in Spain."

The Spanish sealed the conquest of Peru by entering Cuzco on 15 November 1533. Jauja, in the fertile Mantaro Valley, was established as Peru's provisional capital in April 1534, but it was high up in the mountains and too distant from the sea to serve as the capital. Pizarro founded the city of Lima on Peru's central coast on 6 January 1535, which he considered to be one of the most important things he had created in life.

By early 1536, Manco Inca Yupanqui, supported by an army of perhaps 100,000 people, initiated a siege of Cuzco. At the same time, smaller Inca expeditionary forces moved to destroy other European strongholds. In the three years of continuous warfare since the arrival of Pizarro, Inca military leaders had become familiar with Spanish military tactics and developed effective counters. Perhaps the most effective of these military innovations was the one that dealt with the Europeans' greatest advantage on the battlefield: horses. Inca soldiers would offer battle but hold their position until the Spaniards had concentrated their cavalry in order to break the indigenous line. They would then fall back before the cavalry charge and draw the Europeans into a canyon where previously positioned forces could crush them under avalanches of rocks and missile weapons. Instead of charging the numerically inferior Europeans as they had done early on, Inca soldiers used their discipline and knowledge of the terrain in order to draw the armoured cavalry charge into a death trap. Well-documented battlefield deaths show that many more Spaniards died in these battles than in the early days of the war when theoretically the Inca had a much greater advantage. Despite winning the majority of the battles, the inability of the Inca forces to overwhelm Cuzco's fortifications, manned as they were by only 200 fighting men armed with gunpowder weapons, signalled the definitive victory of Spanish forces.

After the final effort of the Inca to recover Cuzco had been defeated by Almagro, a dispute occurred between Pizarro and Almagro regarding the limits of their jurisdiction, as both claimed the city of Cuzco. The king of Spain had awarded the Governorate of New Toledo to Almagro and the Governorate of New Castile to Pizarro. The dispute had originated from a disagreement on how to interpret the limit between the governorates. This led to confrontations between the Pizarro brothers and Almagro, who was eventually defeated during the Battle of Las Salinas in 1538 and executed. Almagro's son, also named Diego and known as El Mozo, was later stripped of his lands and left bankrupt by Pizarro.

Atahualpa's wife, 10-year-old Cuxirimay Ocllo Yupanqui, was with Atahualpa's army in Cajamarca and had stayed with him while he was imprisoned. Following his execution, she was taken to Cuzco, given the name Doña Angelina and made the concubine of Francisco Pizarro. By 1538, it was known she had borne Pizarro two sons, Juan and Francisco.

== Assassination ==
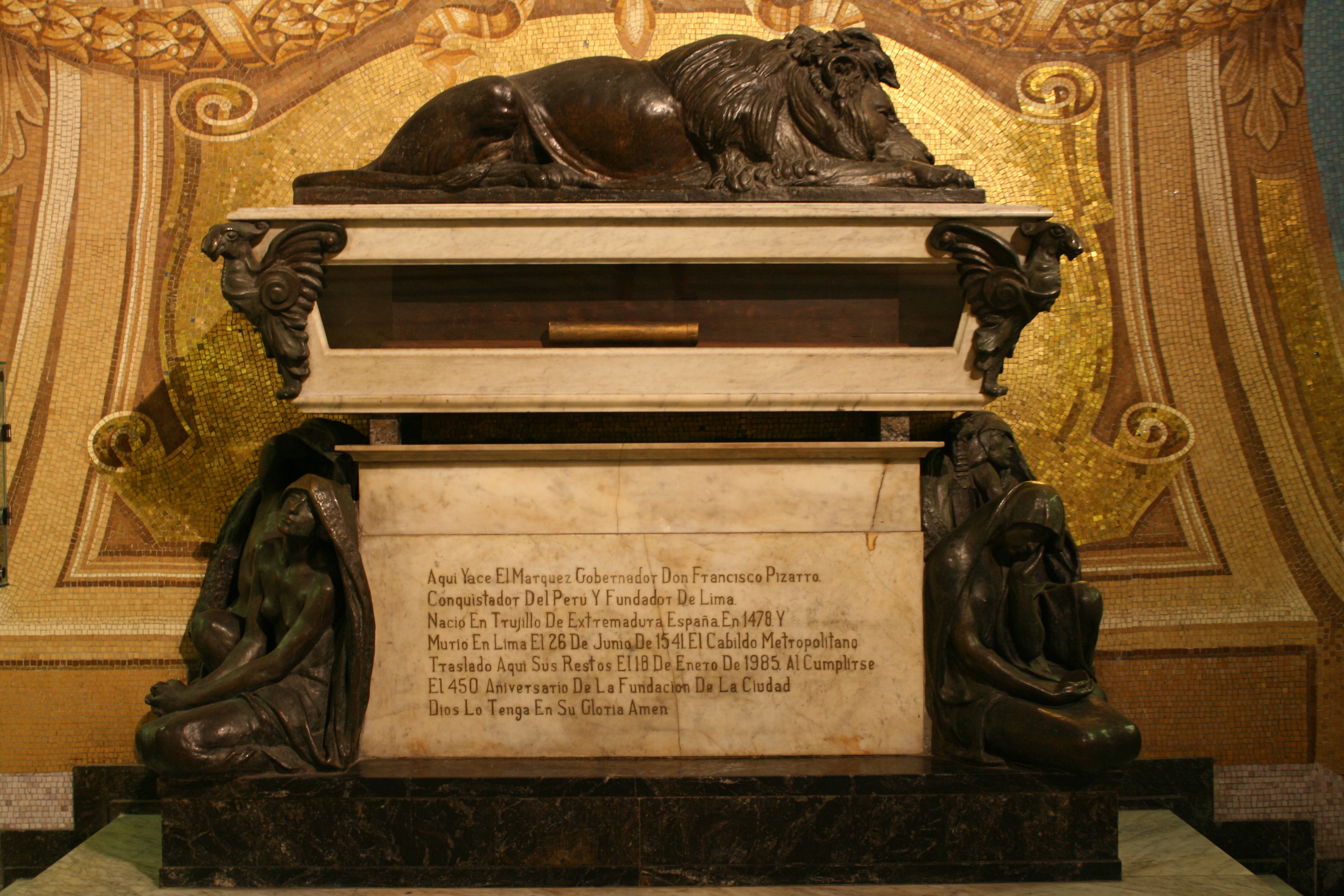
Tomb of Francisco Pizarro in the Lima Cathedral in Lima, Peru

In Lima, on 26 June 1541 "a group of 20 heavily armed supporters of Diego de Almagro II stormed Pizarro's palace, assassinating him and then forcing the terrified city council to appoint young Almagro as the new governor of Peru". "Most of Pizarro's guests fled, but a few fought the intruders, numbered variously between seven and 25. While Pizarro struggled to buckle on his breastplate, his defenders, including his half-brother Martín de Alcántara, were killed". Pizarro killed two attackers and ran through a third. A contemporary chronicler, Agustín de Zárate, wrote that Pizarro fought until "he was too exhausted to brandish his sword" before being struck fatally in the throat. When he fell to the ground he reportedly drew a cross on the floor with his blood and kissed it before dying. A modern forensic examination of his remains indicated that Pizarro had been attacked with multiple stab wounds to his head and neck as well as defensive wounds to his hands and arms.

Pizarro's remains were briefly interred in the cathedral courtyard; at some later time, his head and body were separated and buried in separate boxes underneath the floor of the cathedral. In 1892, in preparation for the anniversary of Christopher Columbus' discovery of the Americas, a body believed to be that of Pizarro was exhumed and put on display in a glass coffin. However, in 1977, men working on the cathedral's foundation discovered a lead box in a sealed niche, which bore the inscription: "Here is the head of Marquess Don Francisco Pizarro who discovered and conquered the kingdoms of Peru and presented them to the crown of Castile." A team of forensic scientists from the United States, led by William R. Maples, was invited to examine the two bodies and they soon determined that the body which had been honoured in the glass case for nearly a century had been incorrectly identified. The skull within the lead box not only bore the marks of multiple sword blows, but the features bore a remarkable resemblance to portraits made of the man in life.

== Legacy and honors ==
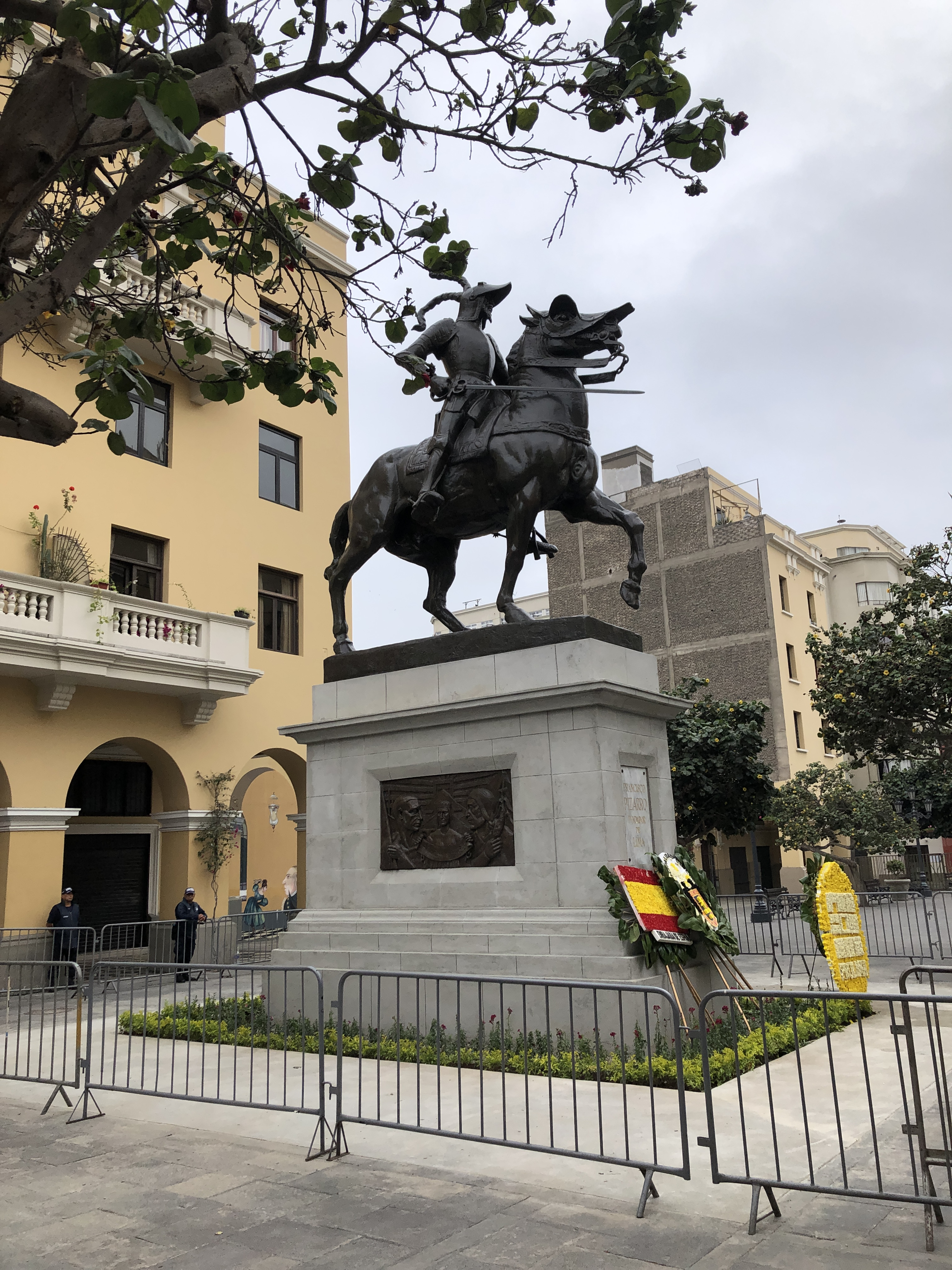
Pizarro's Statue in Lima, Peru

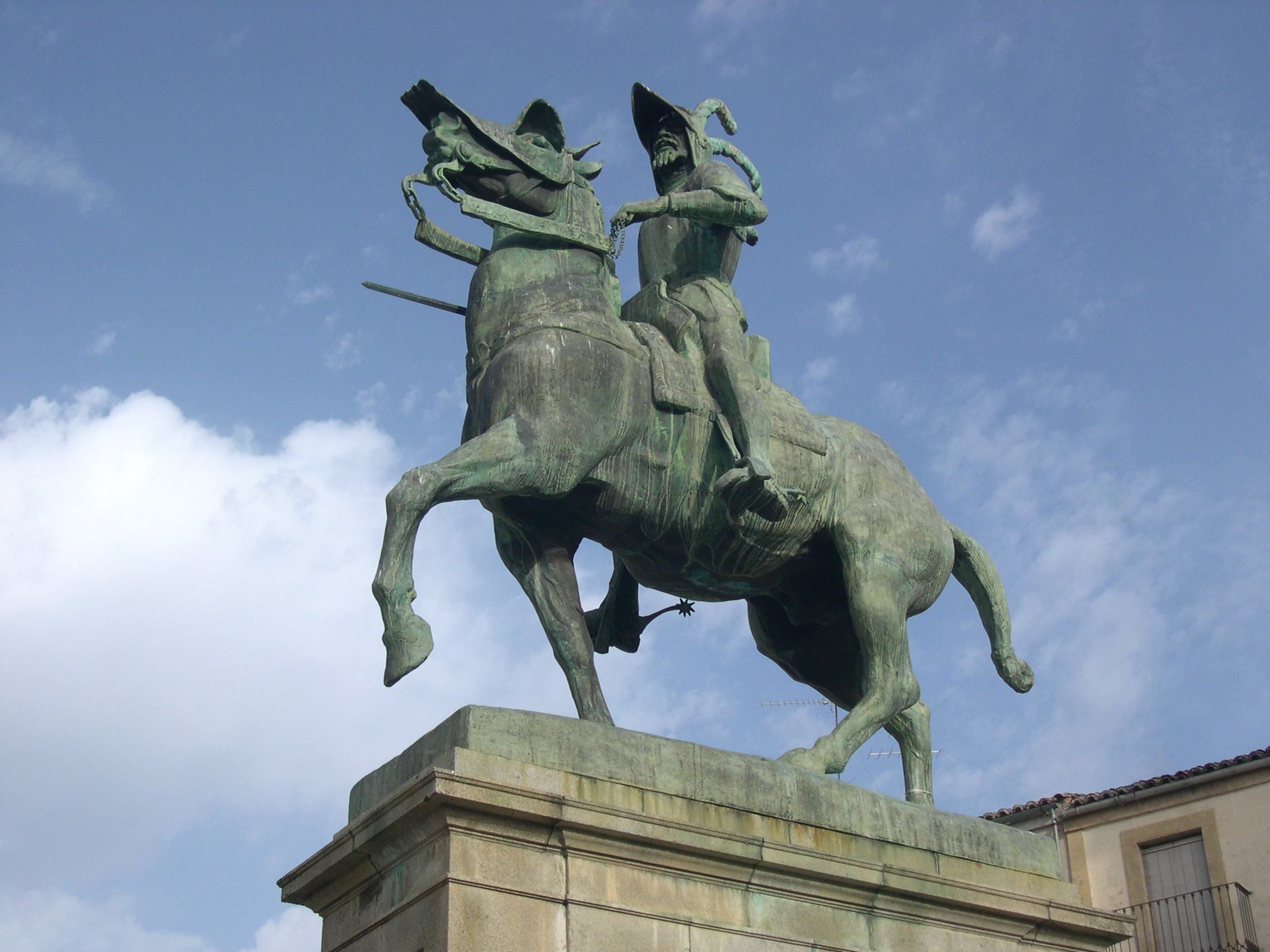
Pizarro's statue in Trujillo, Spain

By his marriage to Quispe Sisa, Pizarro had a son also named Francisco, who married his relative Inés Pizarro, without issue. After Pizarro's death, Inés Yupanqui, whom he took as a mistress, Inca princess and favourite sister of Atahualpa, who had been given to Francisco in marriage by her brother, married a Spanish cavalier named Ampuero and left for Spain, taking her daughter who would later be legitimized by imperial decree. Francisca Pizarro Yupanqui eventually married her uncle Hernando Pizarro in Spain on 10 October 1537; the third son of Pizarro who was never legitimized, Francisco, by Doña Angelina, a wife of Atahualpa that he had taken as a mistress, died shortly after reaching Spain.

After his invasion, Pizarro destroyed the Inca state and whilst ruling the area for almost a decade, initiated the decline of local cultures. The Incas' polytheistic religion was replaced by Christianity and much of the local population was reduced to effective serfdom under the Spanish Encomienda system. The cities of the Inca Empire were transformed into Spanish Catholic cities. Pizarro has been reviled for ordering Atahualpa's death despite the ransom payment (which Pizarro kept, after paying the Spanish king his due). Some Peruvians, particularly those of indigenous descent, may regard him negatively.

=== Sculptures ===
In the early 1930s, sculptor Ramsay MacDonald created three copies of an anonymous European foot soldier resembling a conquistador with a helmet, wielding a sword and riding a horse. The first copy was offered to Mexico to represent Cortés, though it was rejected. The statue was taken to Lima in 1934 and re-purposed to represent Pizarro. One other copy of the statue was unveiled in Wisconsin. The mounted statue of Pizarro in the Plaza Mayor in Trujillo, Spain, was created by American sculptor Charles Cary Rumsey. It was presented to the city by his widow in 1926.

In Peru, the statue's original location was the atrium of the Metropolitan Cathedral of Lima.

In 1952 it was moved to the Plaza Pizarro, and in 2003 it was relocated to Parque de La Muralla after 17 months in a warehouse, without the pedestal with which it was inaugurated and that it had throughout its history, being placed on a concrete base. On 15 January 2025, it was again moved to a pedestrian street next to the Plaza Mayor to be inaugurated, with the pedestal, as part of the city's 490th anniversary on the 18th.

=== Palace of the Conquest ===
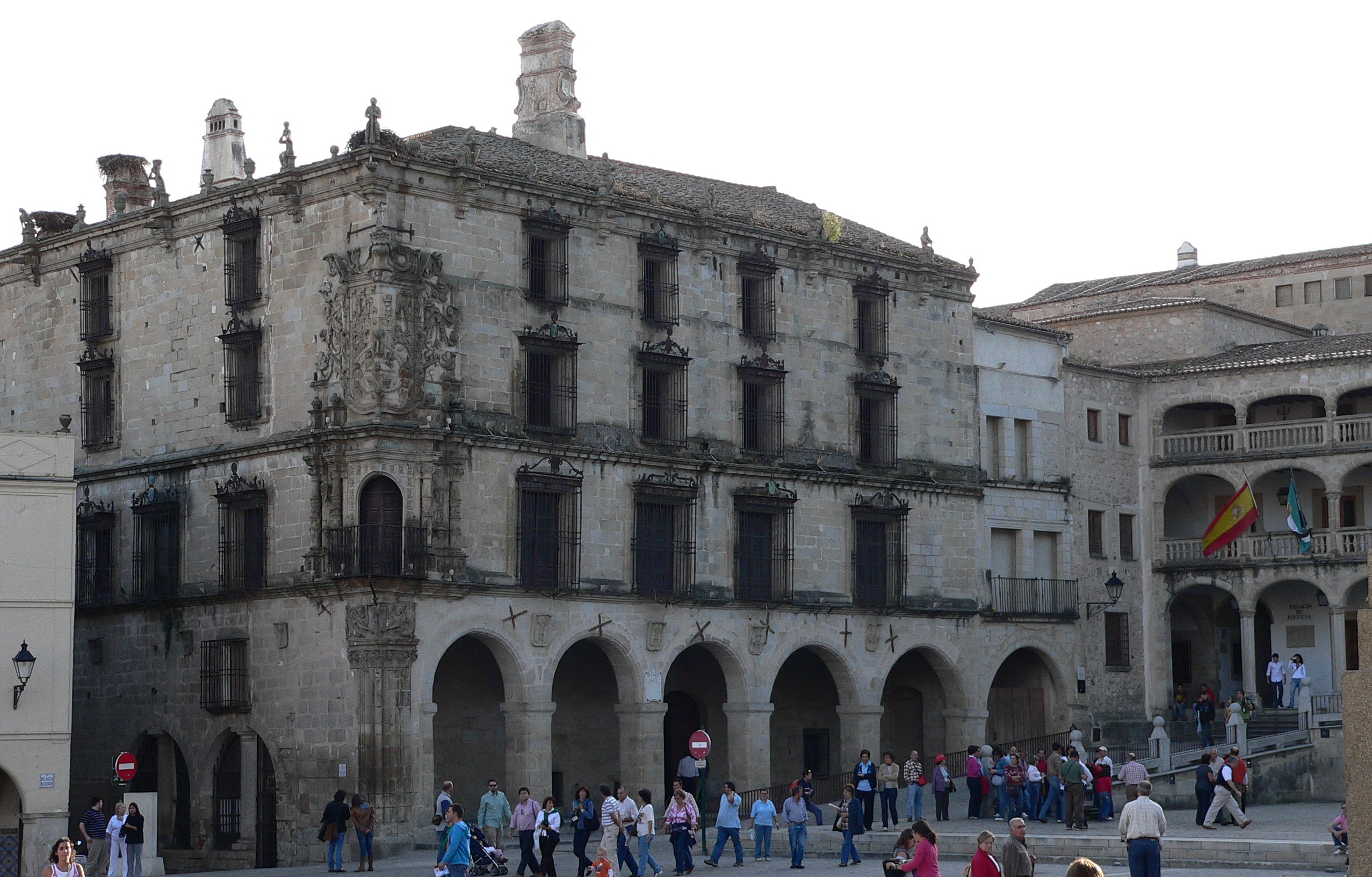
Palace of the Conquest, Trujillo, Spain

After returning from Peru extremely wealthy, the Pizarro family erected a plateresque-style palace on the corner of the Plaza Mayor in Trujillo. Francisca Pizarro Yupanqui and her uncle/husband Hernando Pizarro ordered the construction of the palace; it features busts of them and others. It instantly became a recognizable symbol of the plaza.

The opulent palace is structured in four stands, giving it the significance of the coat of arms of the Pizarro family, which is situated at one of its corner balconies displaying its iconographic content. The building's decor includes plateresque ornaments and balustrades.

== In popular culture ==
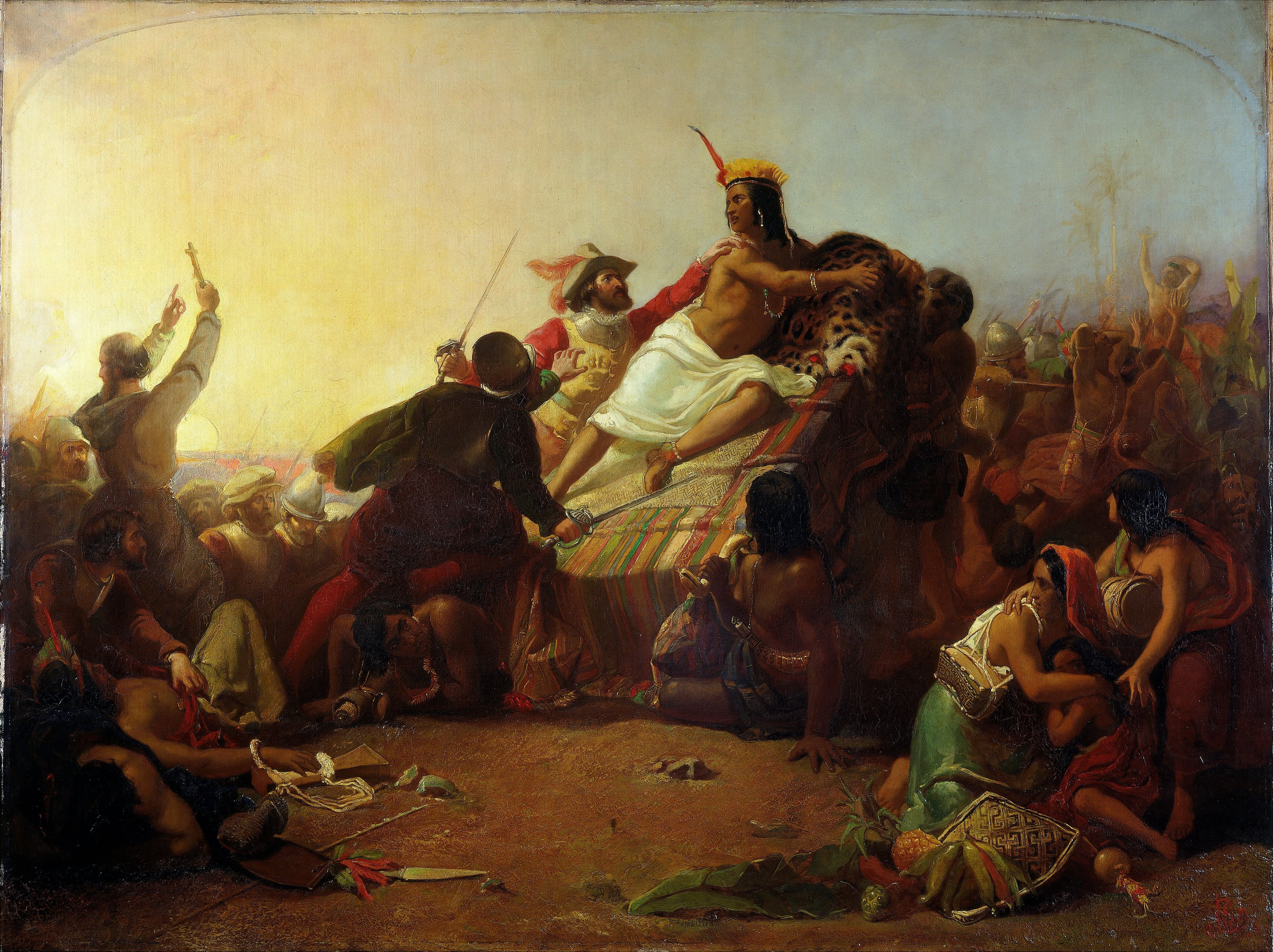
Pizarro Seizing the Inca of Peru by John Everett Millais, 1846

- Pizarro is the title and subject of a dramatic tragedy by Richard Brinsley Sheridan, presented in 1799. Sheridan based his work on the German tragedy by August von Kotzebue, Die Spanier in Peru.
- Pizarro is the main protagonist of the theatre play The Royal Hunt of the Sun and a film of the same name. Rather than an accurate depiction of historical events, its subject is Pizarro's spirituality and personal relationship with Atahualpa. The film mostly stays true to the dialogue-based character of the play and a chamber setting while providing respected actors of the time (1969).
- Francisco Pizarro is depicted as a major supporting character in The Mysterious Cities of Gold, where he is obsessed with locating one of the seven lost cities of gold. In the English version of the series, the character of Pizarro is voiced by Maurice Podbrey.
- The novel "Un puñado de gloria" by Eduardo Sguiglia has Francisco Pizarro as one of the main protagonists and narrates his overthrow and fall.
- Pizarro is also the protagonist in the historical novel The Gold of Caxamalca by Jakob Wassermann.
- Pizarro is a character in "Surya kandle Sona" (The golden tears of the sun), a novella in Bengali, penned by Premendra Mitra. Pizarro is depicted as a scheming fortune-hunter who conquered Peru by dint of treachery and the ruthless application of the Machiavellian policy of putting expediency above morality. The protagonist of the story is Ghanaram (an ancestor of Ghanashyam Das, a teller of tall tales) who wages a heroic struggle against the Spanish conquistadors to emancipate Peru from the fetters of slavery but ultimately fails to fulfil his mission. (Source: Ghanada Samagra, volume 3, Ananda Publishers)
- Randall Garrett, known mainly as a science fiction writer, wrote the novelette Despoilers of the Golden Empire, whose language leads readers to believe they are reading a story about a space invasion in the far future, while in fact it describes Pizarro's conquest of the Incas. As noted by Garrett, every word of the story is historically accurate, but it was written in a deliberately misleading way.
- Pizarro appears in 2025's Civilization VII as a conquistador for the Spanish Empire. He is one of the options for a Great Person during the exploration era.

== Works of Pizarro ==
- Pizarro, Francisco (15 January 2009). "Cartas del Marqués Don Francisco Pizarro (1533–1541)". KUPRIENKO. bloknot.info (A. Skromnitsky).
- Pizarro, Francisco (15 January 2009). "Cédula de encomienda de Francisco Pizarro a Diego Maldonado, Cuzco, 15 de abril de 1539". KUPRIENKO. bloknot.info (A. Skromnitsky, in Russian).
- "Francisco Pizarro response to a petition by Pedro del Barco", 14 April 1539. From the Collections at the Library of Congress

Government offices
Preceded by Position founded	Governor of New Castile; 1528 – 1541	Succeeded by Cristóbal Vaca de Castro
