= Diego de Almagro =

Spanish conquistador (1475–1538)

Adelantado Diego de Almagro
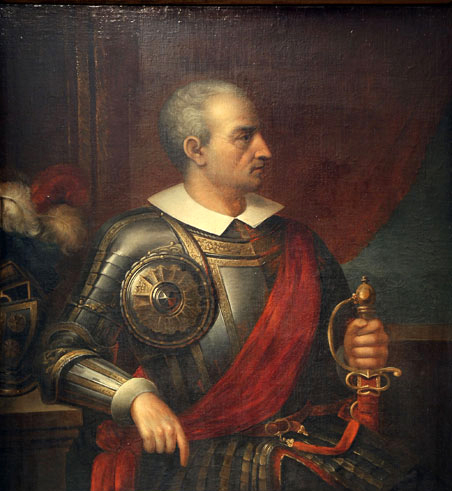

Personal details
- Born: c.1475 Malagón or Almagro, Crown of Castile
- Died: July 8, 1538 (aged 62–63) Cuzco, New Castile, Spanish Empire
- Spouse(s): Ana Martínez; Mencia
- Children: Diego de Almagro II (son); Isabel de Almagro (daughter)
- Parents: Juan de Montenegro (father); Elvira Gutiérrez (mother)
- Occupation: Conquistador
- Known for: Exploration of the Kuna; Conquest of Peru; Discovery of Chile

Military service
- Battles/wars: Conquest of Peru: Battle of Cajamarca; Battle of Vilcaconga; Battle of Abancay; Battle of Las Salinas

Diego de Almagro (Spanish: [ˈdjeɣo ðe alˈmaɣɾo]; c. 1475 – July 8, 1538), also known as El Adelantado and El Viejo, was a Spanish conquistador known for his exploits and killings in western South America. He participated with Francisco Pizarro in the Spanish conquest of Peru. While subduing the Inca Empire he laid the foundation for Quito and Trujillo as Spanish cities in present-day Ecuador and Peru, respectively. From Peru, Almagro led the first Spanish military expedition to central Chile. Back in Peru, a longstanding conflict with Pizarro over the control of the former Inca capital of Cuzco erupted into a civil war between the two bands of conquistadores. In the battle of Las Salinas in 1538, Almagro was defeated by the Pizarro brothers and months later he was executed.

== Early years ==
Shield of Diego de Almagro

De Almagro's origins were humble. He was born in 1475 in the village of Almagro or in Malagón, in Ciudad Real, where he was given the name of the village for his surname as he was the illegitimate son of Juan de Montenegro and Elvira Gutiérrez. In order to preserve the honor of his mother, her relatives took the infant Diego to the nearby town of Bolaños de Calatrava, where he was raised by Sancha López del Peral, later moving to Aldea del Rey.

At the age of four he returned to Almagro, and was placed under the tutelage of an uncle named Hernán Gutiérrez. At age fifteen he ran away from home because of his uncle's harshness. He went to the home of his mother, who was now living with her new husband, to tell her what had happened and that he was going to travel the world, and asked for some bread. His mother, anguished, gave him a piece of bread and some coins and said: "Take, son, and do not give me more trouble, and go, and God help you in your adventure."

He went to Seville and after probably stealing to survive, Almagro became a criado or servant of Don Luis Gonzalez de Polanco, one of the four Alcaldes de la Casa y Corte de Su Majestad and later a Counselor of the Catholic Monarchs. While living in Seville, Almagro stabbed another servant in an argument, inflicting serious enough injuries that he was to be tried in court.

Don Luis, using his influence, prevailed upon Don Pedro Arias Dávila to allow Almagro to embark in one of the ships going to the New World from the port of Sanlucar de Barrameda. The Casa de Contratacion (royal agency for the Spanish Empire) required that the men who crossed the Atlantic provide their own weapons, clothes, and farming tools, which Don Polanco provided to his servant.

== Arrival in America ==
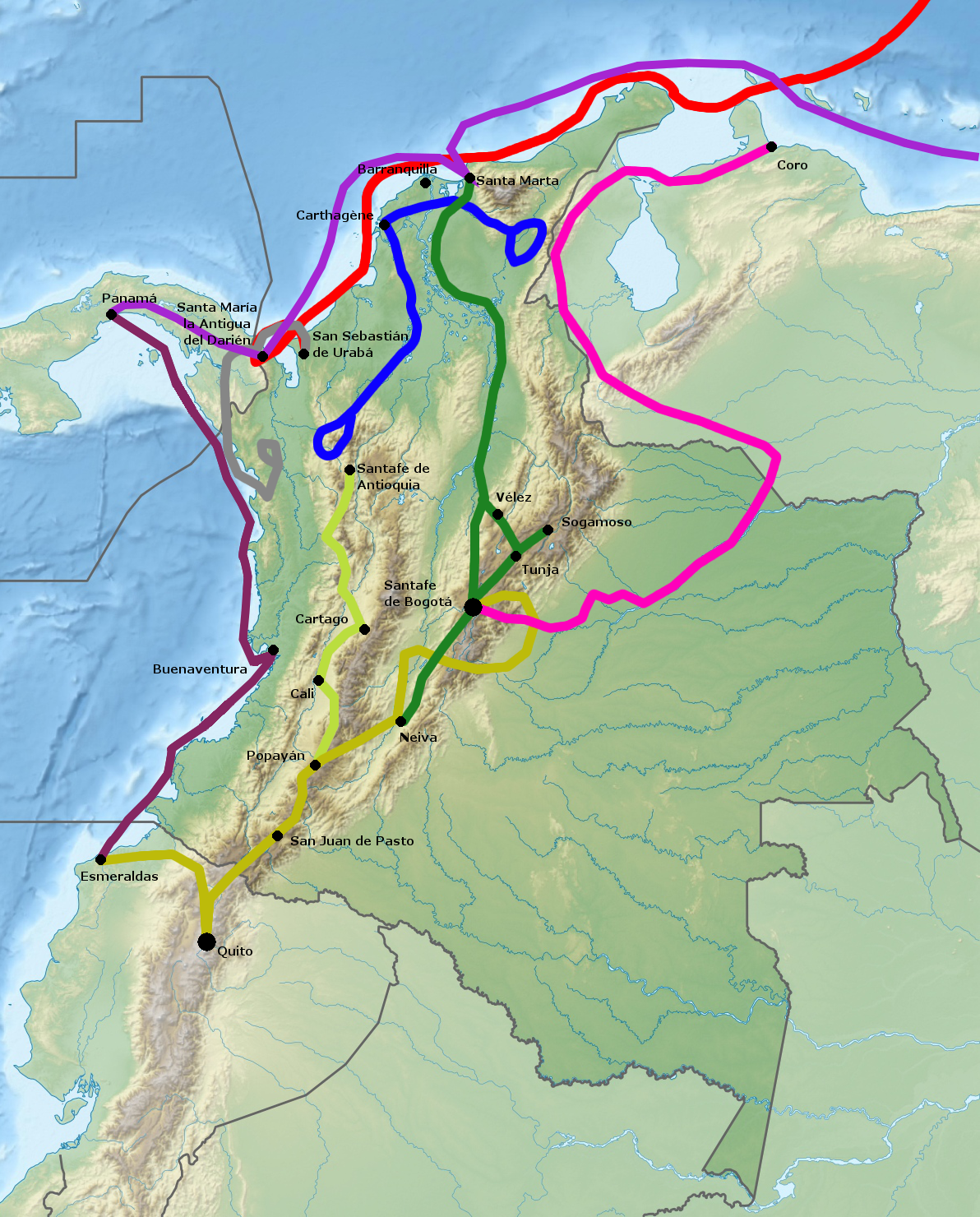
Conquest of Colombia Route by Diego de Almagro shown in purple

Diego de Almagro, now in his late thirties, arrived in the New World on June 30, 1514, with the expedition that Ferdinand II of Aragon had sent under the leadership of Dávila. The expedition arrived at the city of Santa María la Antigua del Darién, Panama, where many other future conquistadors were already assembled, among them Francisco Pizarro.

There are not many details of Almagro's activities during this period, but it is known that he accompanied various sailors who departed from Darien between 1514 and 1515. He eventually returned and settled in Darien, where he was granted an encomienda, building a house and making a living from agriculture.

Almagro undertook his first independent conquest on November 1515, commanding 260 men as he founded Villa del Acla, named after the Indian place. Due to illness he had to hand over command to Gaspar de Espinosa.

Espinosa decided to undertake a new expedition, which departed in December 1515 with 200 men, including Almagro and Francisco Pizarro, who for the first time was designated as a captain. During this expedition, which lasted 14 months, Almagro, Pizarro and Hernando de Luque became close friends.

Also during this time Almagro established a friendship with Vasco Núñez de Balboa, who was in charge of Acla. Almagro wanted to have a ship built with the remaining materials of the Espinosa expedition, to be finished on the coast of the "Great South Sea", as the Pacific Ocean was first called by the Spanish. Current historians do not believe that Almagro was expected to participate in Balboa's expedition and probably returned to Darien.

Almagro took part in the various expeditions that took place in the Gulf of Panama, including those of Espinosa, which were supported by Balboa's ships. Almagro was recorded as a witness on the lists of natives whom Espinosa ordered to be carried. He remained as an early settler in the newly founded city of Panama, staying there for four years, managing his properties and those of Pizarro. He took Ana Martínez, an indigenous woman, as a common-law wife. In this period, his first son, El Mozo, was born to them. By some accounts it was Almagro's former black African slave Malgarida who was the mother of Diego de Almagro II.

== Conquest of Peru ==
By 1524 an association of conquest regarding South America was formalized among De Almagro, Pizarro and Luque. By the beginning of August 1524, they had received the requisite permission to discover and conquer lands further south. In the first expedition, De Almagro lost his eye to an arrow shot at the Battle of Punta Quemada. He subsequently remained in Panama to recruit men and gather supplies for the expeditions led by Pizarro.

After several expeditions to South America, Pizarro secured his stay in Peru with the Capitulation on 6 July 1529. During Pizarro's continued exploration of Incan territory, he and his men succeeded in defeating the Inca army under Emperor Atahualpa during the Battle of Cajamarca in 1532. De Almagro joined Pizarro soon afterward, bringing more men and arms.

After Peru fell to the Spanish, both Pizarro and De Almagro initially worked together in the founding of new cities to consolidate their dominions. As such, Pizarro dispatched De Almagro to pursue Quizquiz, fleeing to the Inca Empire's northern city of Quito. Their fellow conquistador Sebastián de Belalcázar, who had gone forth without Pizarro's approval, had already reached Quito and witnessed the destruction of the city by Inca general Rumiñawi. The Inca warrior had ordered the city to be burned and its gold to be buried at an undisclosed location where the Spanish could never find it. The arrival of Pedro de Alvarado from Guatemala, in search of Inca gold further complicated the situation for Almagro and Belalcázar. Alvarado's presence, however, did not last long as he left South America in exchange for monetary compensation from Pizarro.

In an attempt to claim Quito ahead of Belalcázar, in August 1534 De Almagro founded a city on the shores of Laguna de Colta (Colta Lake) in the foothills of Chimborazo, some 200 kilometres (120 mi) south of present-day Quito, and named it "Santiago de Quito." Four months later would come the foundation of the Peruvian city of Trujillo, which Almagro named as "Villa Trujillo de Nueva Castilla" (the Village of Trujillo in New Castille) in honor of Francisco Pizarro's birthplace, Trujillo in Extremadura, Spain. These events were the height of the Pizarro-Almagro friendship, which historians describe as one of the last events in which their friendship soon faded and entered a period of turmoil for the control of the Incan capital of Cuzco.

== Conflict with Pizarro ==
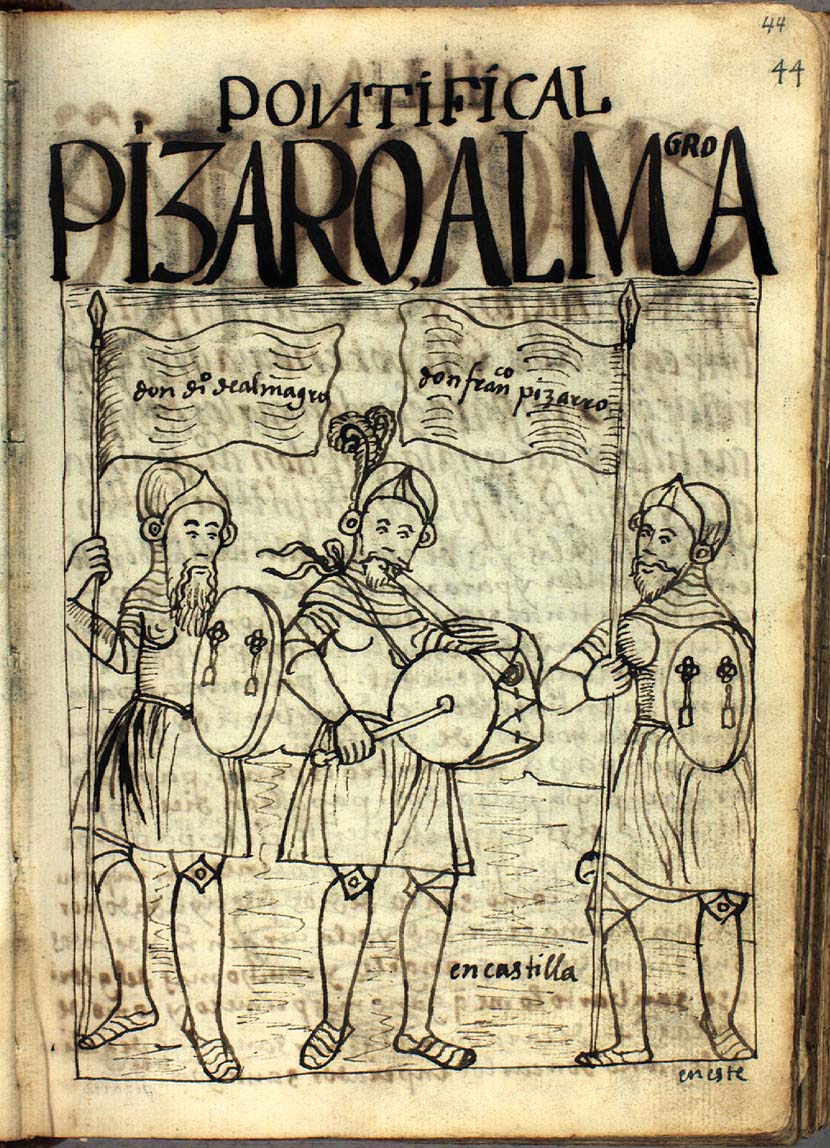
Diego de Almagro with Francisco Pizarro in Castile drawing from 1615

After splitting the treasure of Inca emperor Atahualpa, both Pizarro and Almagro left towards Cuzco and took the city in 1533. However, De Almagro's friendship with Pizarro showed signs of deterioration in 1526 when Pizarro, in the name of the rest of the conquistadors, called forth the "Capitulacion de Toledo" law in which King Charles I of Spain had laid out his authorization for the conquest of Peru and the awards every conquistador would receive from it. Long before, however, each conquistador had promised to equally split the benefits. Pizarro managed to have a larger stake and awards for himself. Despite this, De Almagro still obtained an important fortune for his services, and the King awarded him in November 1532 the noble title of "Don" and he was assigned a personal coat of arms.

Although by this time Diego de Almagro had already acquired sufficient wealth in the conquest of Peru and was living a luxurious life in Cuzco, the prospect of conquering the lands further south was very attractive to him. Given that the dispute with Pizarro over Cuzco had kept intensifying, Almagro spent a great deal of time and money equipping a company of 500 men for a new exploration south of Peru.

By 1534 the Spanish crown had determined to split the region in two parallel lines, forming the governorship of "Nueva Castilla" (from the 1° to the 14° latitude, close to Pisco), and that of "Nueva Toledo" (from the 14° to the 25° latitude, in Taltal, Chile), assigning the first to Francisco Pizarro and the second to Diego de Almagro. The crown had previously assigned Almagro the governorship of Cuzco, and as such De Almagro was heading there when Charles V divided the territory between Nueva Castilla and Nuevo Toledo. This might have been the reason why Almagro did not immediately confront Pizarro for Cuzco, and promptly decided to embark on his new quest for the discovery of the riches of Chile.

== Discovery of Chile ==
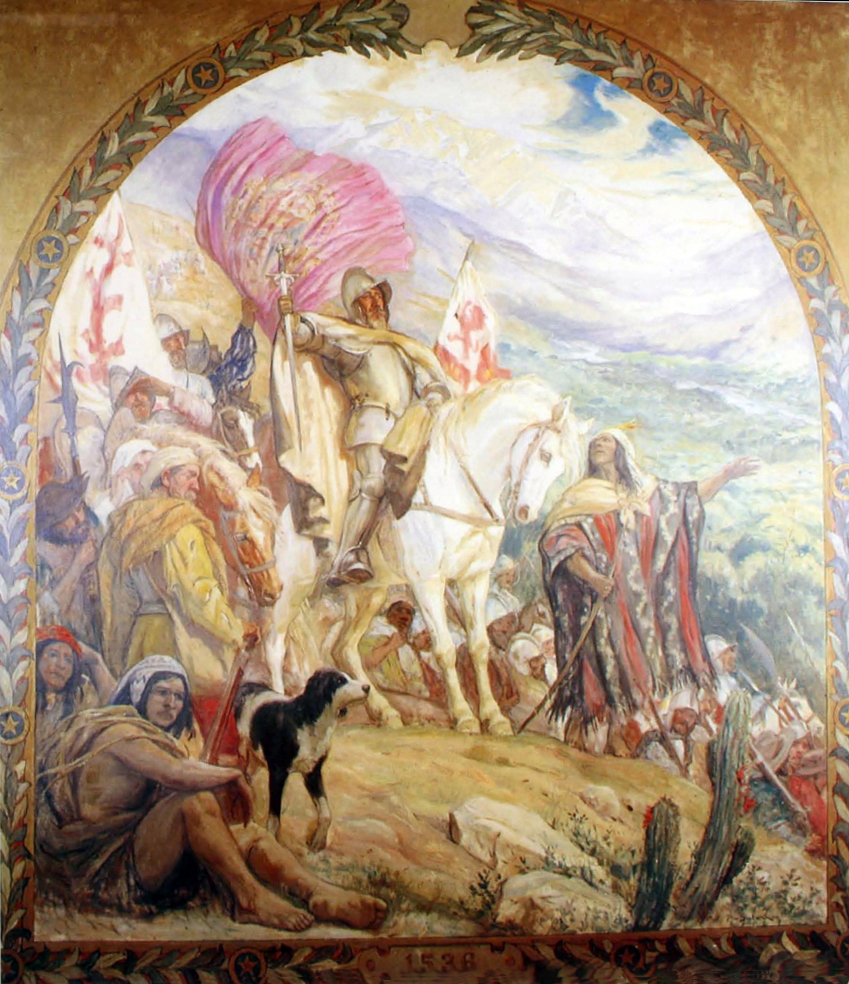
Almagro takes possession of Chile in the valley of Copiapó painting from first half 20th century

=== The preparations ===
Charles V had given Diego a grant extending two hundred leagues south of Francisco Pizarro's. Francisco and Diego concluded a new contract on 12 June 1535, in which they agreed to share future discoveries equally. Diego raised an expedition for Chile, expecting it "would lead to even greater riches than they had found in Peru." Almagro prepared the way by sending ahead three of his Spanish soldiers, the religious chief of the Inca empire, Willaq Umu, and Paullo Topa, brother of Manco Inca Yupanqui. De Almagro sent Juan de Saavedra forward with one hundred and fifty men, and soon followed them with additional forces. Saavedra established on January 23, 1535, the first Spanish settlement in Bolivia near the Inca regional capital of Paria.

=== Following the Inca Trail and crossing the Andes ===
Almagro left Cuzco on July 3, 1535, with his supporters and stopped at Moina until the 20th of that month. Meanwhile, Francisco Pizarro's brother, Juan Pizarro, had arrested Inca Manco Inca Yupanqui, further complicating De Almagro's plans as it heavily increased the dissatisfaction of the Indians submitted to Spanish rule. Not having formally been appointed governor of any territories in the Capitulation of Toledo in 1528, however, forcing him to declare himself adelantado (governor) of Nueva Toledo, or southern Peru and present-day Chile. Some sources suggest Almagro received such a requirement in 1534 by the Spanish king and was officially declared governor of New Toledo.

Once he left Moina, De Almagro followed the Inca trail followed by 750 Spaniards deciding to join him in quest for the gold lost in the ransom of Atahualpa, which had mainly benefited the Pizarro brothers and their supporters. After crossing the Bolivian mountain range and traveling past Lake Titicaca, Almagro arrived on the shores of the Desaguadero River and finally set up camp in Tupiza. From there, the expedition stopped at Chicoana and then turned to the southeast to cross the Andes mountains.

The expedition turned out to be a difficult and exhausting endeavor. The hardest phase was the crossing of the Andean cordilleras: the cold, hunger and tiredness meant the death of various Spanish and natives, but mainly slaves who were not accustomed to such rigorous climate.

Upon this point, De Almagro determined everything was a failure. He ordered a small group under Rodrigo Orgóñez on a reconnaissance of the country to the south.

By luck, these men found the Valley of Copiapó, where Gonzalo Calvo Barrientos, a Spanish soldier whom Pizarro had expelled from Peru for stealing objects the Inca had offered for his ransom, had already established a friendship with the local natives. There, in the valley of the river Copiapó, Almagro took official possession of Chile and claimed it in the name of King Charles V.

== Dismayed in Chile ==
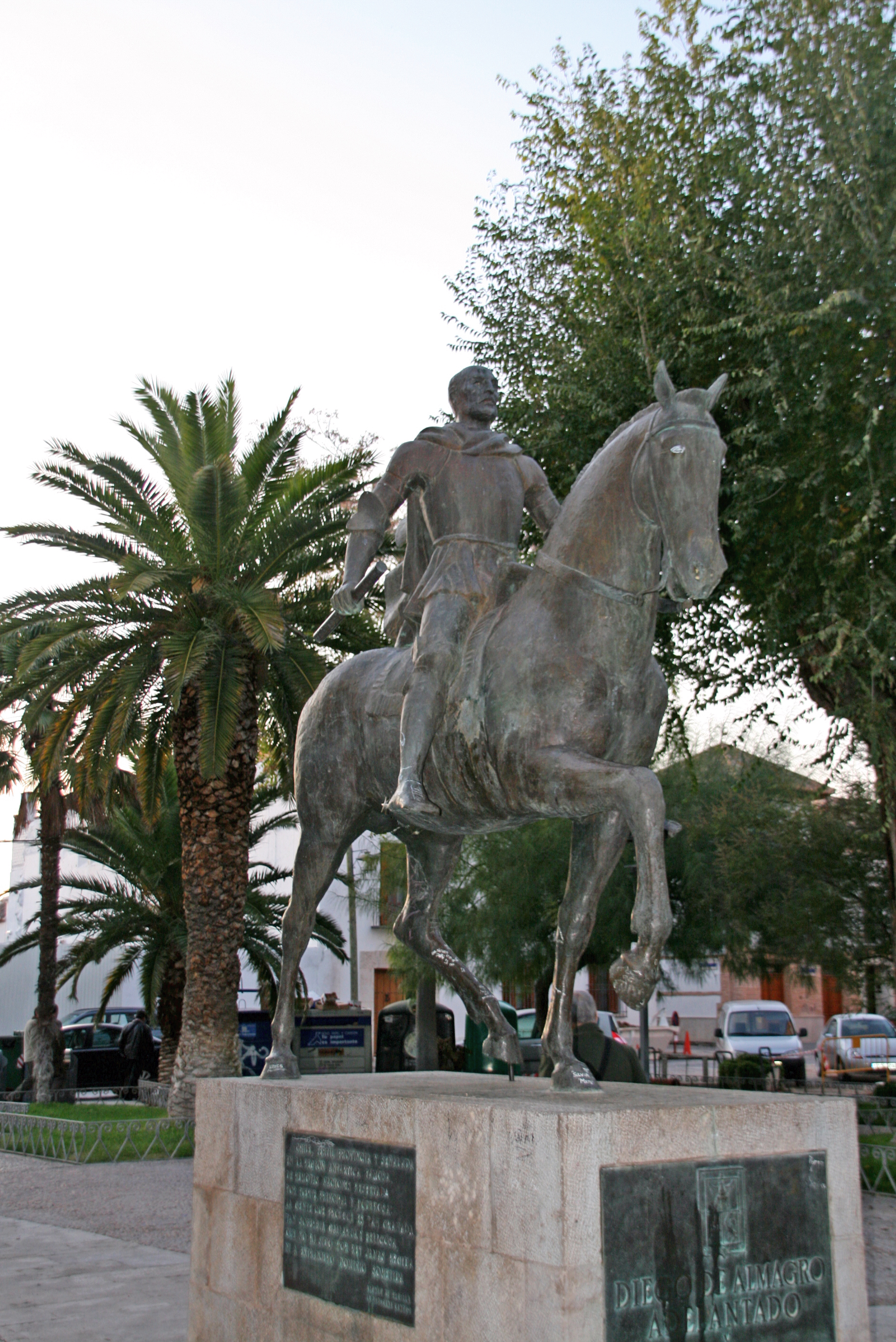
Statue of De Almagro in Almagro, Spain

De Almagro promptly initiated the exploration of the new territory, starting up the valley the Aconcagua River, where he was well received by the natives. However, the intrigues of his interpreter, Felipillo, who had previously helped Pizarro in dealing with Atahualpa, almost thwarted De Almagro's efforts. Felipillo had secretly urged the local natives to attack the Spanish, but they desisted, not understanding the dangers that they posed. De Almagro directed Gómez de Alvarado along with 100 horsemen and 100 foot to continue the exploration, which ended in the confluence of the Ñuble and Itata rivers. The Battle of Reinohuelén between the Spanish and Mapuche indigenous peoples forced the explorers to return to the north.

De Almagro's own reconnaissance of the land and the bad news of Gómez de Alvarado's encounter with the fierce Mapuche, along with the bitter cold winter that settled ferociously upon them, only served to confirm that everything had failed. He never found gold or the cities which Incan scouts had told him lay ahead, only communities of the indigenous population who lived from subsistence agriculture. Local tribes put up fierce resistance to the Spanish forces. The exploration of the territories of Nueva Toledo, which lasted 2 years, was marked by a complete failure for De Almagro. Despite this, at first he thought staying and founding a city would serve well for his honor. The initial optimism that led Almagro to bring his son he had with the indigenous Panamanian Ana Martínez to Chile had faded.

Some historians have suggested that, but for the urging of his senior explorers, De Almagro would probably have stayed permanently in Chile. He was urged to return to Peru and this time take definitive possession of Cuzco, so as to consolidate an inheritance for his son. Dismayed with his experience in the south, Almagro made plans of return to Peru. He never officially founded a city in the territory of what is now Chile.

The withdrawal of the Spanish from valleys of Chile was violent: Almagro authorized his soldiers to ransack the natives' properties, leaving their soil desolate. In addition, the Spanish soldiers took natives captive to serve as slaves. The locals were captured, tied together, and forced to carry the heavy loads belonging to the conquistadors.

== Return to Peru ==
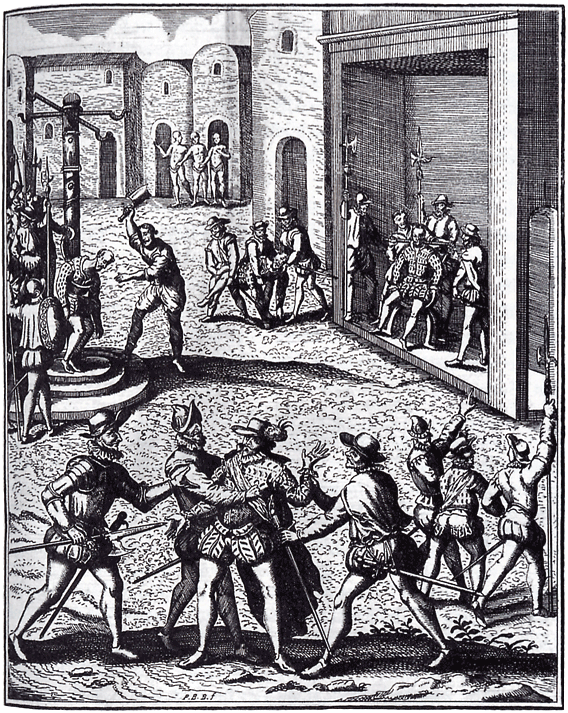
Capture and execution of Diego de Almagro in Cusco. Engraving, circa 1600

After the exhausting crossing of the Atacama Desert, mainly due to the harsh weather conditions, Almagro finally reached Cuzco, Peru, in 1537. According to some authors, it was during this time that the Spanish term "roto" (torn), used by Peruvians to refer to Chileans, was first coined. De Almagro's disappointed troops returned to Cuzco with their "torn clothes" due to the extensive and laborious passage on foot by the Atacama Desert.

After his return, De Almagro was surprised to learn of the Inca Manco's rebellion. Diego de Almagro sent an embassy to the Inca, but they mistrusted all of the Spaniards by this time. Hernando Pizarro's men formed an uneasy truce with De Almagro's men, surveying to determine the boundaries of their leaders' royal grants. They needed to determine in which portion the city of Cuzco was located. However, De Almagro's troops quickly took the city and imprisoned the Pizarro brothers, Hernando and Gonzalo, on the night of 8 April 1537.

After occupying Cuzco, De Almagro confronted an army sent by Francisco Pizarro to liberate his brothers. Alonso de Alvarado commanded it and was defeated during the Battle of Abancay on July 12, 1537. He and some of his men were imprisoned. Later, Gonzalo Pizarro and De Alvarado escaped prison. Subsequent negotiations between Francisco Pizarro and De Almagro concluded with the liberation of Hernando, the third Pizarro brother, in return for conceding control and administration of Cuzco to De Almagro. Pizarro never intended to give up the city permanently, but was buying time to organize an army strong enough to defeat Almagro's troops.

During this time De Almagro fell ill, and Pizarro and his brothers grabbed the opportunity to defeat him and his followers. The Almagristas were defeated at Las Salinas in April 1538, with Orgóñez being killed on the field of battle. De Almagro fled to Cuzco, still in the hands of his loyal supporters, but found only temporary refuge; the forces of the Pizarro brothers entered the city without resistance. Once captured, Almagro was humiliated by Hernando Pizarro and his requests to appeal to the King were ignored.

When Diego de Almagro begged for his life, Hernando responded:

"-he was surprised to see Almagro demean himself in a manner so unbecoming a brave cavalier, that his fate was no worse than had befallen many a soldier before him; and that, since God had given him the grace to be a Christian, he should employ his remaining moments in making up his account with Heaven!"

Almagro was condemned to death and executed by garrote in his dungeon, and then decapitated, on July 8, 1538. His corpse was taken to the public Plaza Mayor of Cuzco, where a herald proclaimed his crimes. Hernán Ponce de León took his body and buried him in the church of Our Lady of Mercy in Cuzco.

== El Mozo ==
Diego de Almagro II (1520–1542), known as El Mozo (The Lad), son of Diego de Almagro I, whose mother was an Indian girl of Panama, became the foil of the conspirators who had put Pizarro to the sword. Pizarro was murdered on June 26, 1541; the conspirators promptly proclaimed the lad De Almagro Governor of Peru. From various causes, all of the conspirators either died or were killed except for one, who was executed after the lad Almagro gave an order. The lad De Almagro fought the desperate battle of Chupas on September 16, 1542, escaped to Cuzco, but was arrested, immediately condemned to death, and executed in the great square of the city.

== See also ==
- History of Cusco
- List of conquistadors in Colombia
- Spanish conquest of the Muisca
- Spanish conquest of the Kuna
- Spanish conquest of the Inca Empire
- History of Chile
- Pedro de Valdivia, Alonso de Ojeda
