= Battle of Las Salinas =

Battle that took place during the Spanish conquest of Peru

- Part of the Spanish conquest of Peru
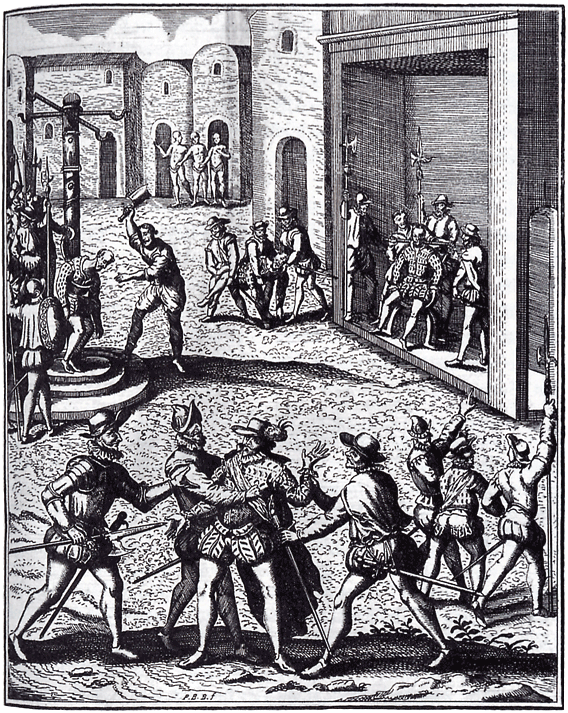
Date	April 26, 1538
Location	near Cuzco, Peru 13°34′00″S 71°58′41″W
Result	Victory for Nueva Castilla

Belligerents
Nueva Castilla	Nueva Toledo

Commanders and leaders
Gonzalo Pizarro; Hernando Pizarro; Alonso de Alvarado; Pedro de Valdivia	Diego de Almagro (POW); Rodrigo Orgóñez †

Strength
700	500; 6 guns

Casualties and losses
9	120 dead
- Location within Peru Battle of Las Salinas (South America) Battle of Las Salinas (America)

The Battle of Las Salinas was a military conflict and decisive confrontation between the forces of Hernando and Gonzalo Pizarro against those of rival conquistador Diego de Almagro, on April 26, 1538, during the Conquest of Peru. Both camps claimed to represent the authority of the Spanish Crown; Pizarro's forces controlled the province of Nueva Castilla, and those of Almagro, Nueva Toledo.

After an hour of carnage, the battle yielded a victory for Pizarro's forces: with Almagro captured and his lieutenant, Rodrigo Orgóñez killed on the field of battle, the Pizarros routed the enemy and took possession of Cuzco. Almagro was executed in July 1538.

== Background ==
The conflict between the Pizarro brothers and Almagro originated in a dispute over the possession of the city of Cuzco during the initial Spanish partition and administration of Peru. While Almagro controlled the city from 1537, both he and the Pizarros considered it under their jurisdiction. Almagro's enterprise had won him several earlier battles, but although he succeeded in taking the city by a coup de main, Pizarro's forces were by far the strongest in the region, leaving him with few options for its defence. Almagro, his fortunes on the wane, invalided by a debilitating disease, turned to Rodrigo Orgóñez to carry out the campaign.

Almagro's men made their first mistake by failing to secure the Guaitara pass guarding the approach to Cuzco; the Pizarros' force, braving the mountains, made a crossing and appeared in force along the coast. At a war council in Cuzco, Almagro even considered a new round of negotiations with the Pizarros; Orgóñez is said to have interrupted: "It is too late; you have liberated Hernando Pizarro, and nothing remains but to fight him."

Accordingly, Orgóñez marched his 500 men toward the ancient Indian salt mines of Cachipampa, situated about 5 km south of Cuzco. His choice of battlefield has been subject to criticism in that the broken terrain limited the use of his cavalry, which accounted for over half his force. The infantry, furthermore, was short on weapons and many were armed only with pikes. A battery of six falconets, on the other hand, gave him a marked advantage over his foes.

Pizarro's army consisted largely of infantry and numbered about 700. His cavalry was outmatched by Almagro's strong force of seasoned cavaliers, but in addition to veteran conquistadors he could rely on a contingent of Imperial arquebusiers recently arrived from Santo Domingo.

== The battle ==
Orgóñez placed his infantry in the centre and a division of cavalry on each wing. Pizarro's army mirrored this deployment, with Alonso de Alvarado commanding one corps of cavalry and Hernando Pizarro the other. Gonzalo Pizarro led the battalion of infantry which spearheaded the first attack across the small river separating the two armies. Fire from Orgóñez's guns bit into Gonzalo's column and threw it into disorder, but the swampy ground prevented Orgóñez's cavalry from exploiting this advantage. Meanwhile, Pizarro's Imperial troops, gaining the other side, opened a murderous fire of double-headed shot on their enemies.

With the infantry locked in combat in the marshes, both Pizarro and Orgóñez brought forth their cavalry. On both sides, the left and right wings of cavalry merged into single columns under Orgóñez on one hand and Pizarro on the other. An epic shock followed as the two bodies met at full gallop, the men variously shouting "¡El Rey y Almagro!" or "¡El Rey y Pizarro!" Orgóñez, in the thick of the desperate fighting, was shot, unhorsed, and murdered while offering his surrender. His death unhinged his cavalry, which began to fall back in confusion despite its superiority.

Almagro's infantry, meanwhile, stood no chance against the superior firepower of Pizarro's men and, after an hour of brave fighting, began to scatter in the direction of Cuzco. Almagro watched the rout from his litter on a hill: "With an agony not to be described, he had seen his faithful followers, after their hard struggle, borne down by their opponents till, convinced that all was lost, he succeeded in mounting a mule, and rode off for a temporary refuge to the fortress of Cuzco."

Juan de Málaga, the husband of conquistadora Inés Suárez reportedly died in the battle of Salinas.
