= History of Cusco =

History of a Peruvian city

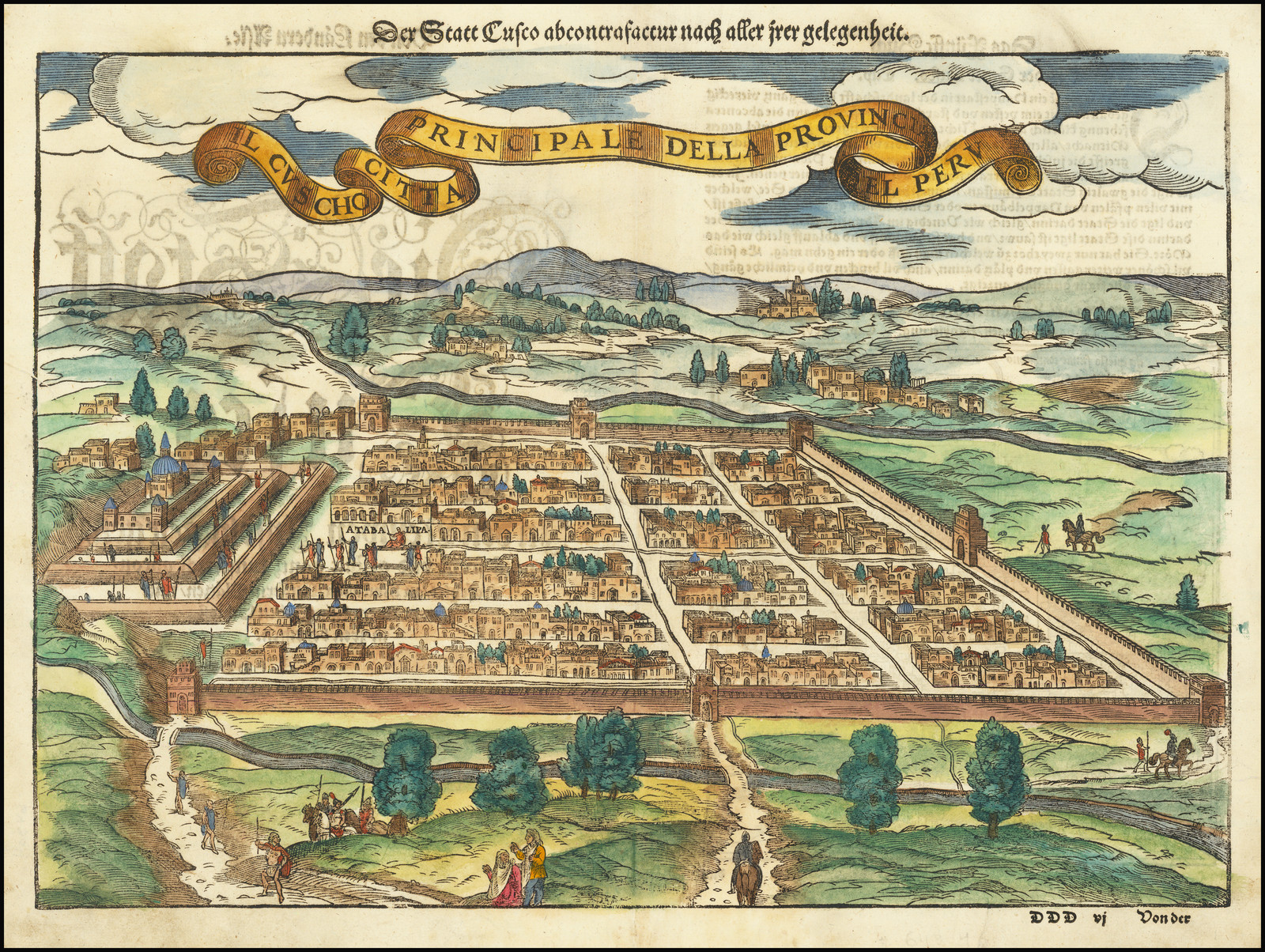
View of the Inca Cusco in 1574 by Sebastian Münster.

Cusco in Peru is the historical capital of the Incas.

== Foundation and Inca period ==
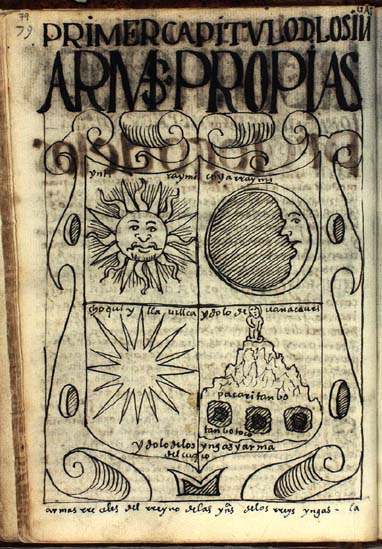
"Coat of Arms of the Kingdom of the Incas", painted in 1615 by the Inca Guamán Poma. Royal Danish Library.

According to the legend collected by the "Inca" Garcilaso de la Vega, Manco Cápac and Mama Ocllo migrated from Lake Titicaca on the advice of their father, the god Sun. They threw a golden javelin; where it was nailed they founded a new town. The place chosen was called Cusco:

The first stop they made in this valley, said the Inca, was on the hill called Huanacauti, at noon of this city. There they tried to land the golden bar on land, which very easily sank them to the first blow they hit with it, which they saw no more. Then our Inca said to his sister and woman: In this valley our father the sun sends to stop and make our seat and abode, to fulfill his will, Therefore, queen and sister, it is convenient that each one for his part we will summon and attract these people for indoctrinating them and to do the good that our father the sun sends us.

— Chapter XVI: Fundación del Cozco ciudad imperial, in Comentarios reales de los incas (1609), Inca Garcilaso de la Vega

The famous legend, written by Garcilaso, lacks archaeological evidence.

Due to archaeological and anthropological data, the true process of the occupation of Cusco has been studied. The consensus suggests that, due to the collapse of the kingdom of Tiwanaku, the migration of its people took place. This group of about 500 men would have gradually established themselves in the Huatanay River Valley, a process that would culminate in the foundation of the Cusco on the banks of the Saphy River. The approximate date is unknown, but thanks to vestiges it is agreed that the site where the city is located was already inhabited 3000 years ago.

Ancient chronicles like those of the chronicler Pedro Sarmiento de Gamboa (1530–1592) affirm the existence of ethnic groups in the valley of Cusco before the appearance of the Inca Empire. This author mentions the Guallas, the Sahuasiray and the Antasayas as the oldest settlers; while the Alcavistas, Copalimaytas and Culunchimas are considered more recent inhabitants. It is also known that the Ayarmacas inhabited the region, being the only ones that were not crushed by the Incas, becoming their main rivals in the domain of the region.

Cusco was the capital and seat of government of the Kingdom of the Incas and continued to be at the beginning of the imperial era, becoming the most important city in the Andes and South America. This centralism gave it rise and became the main cultural focus and axis of religious worship.

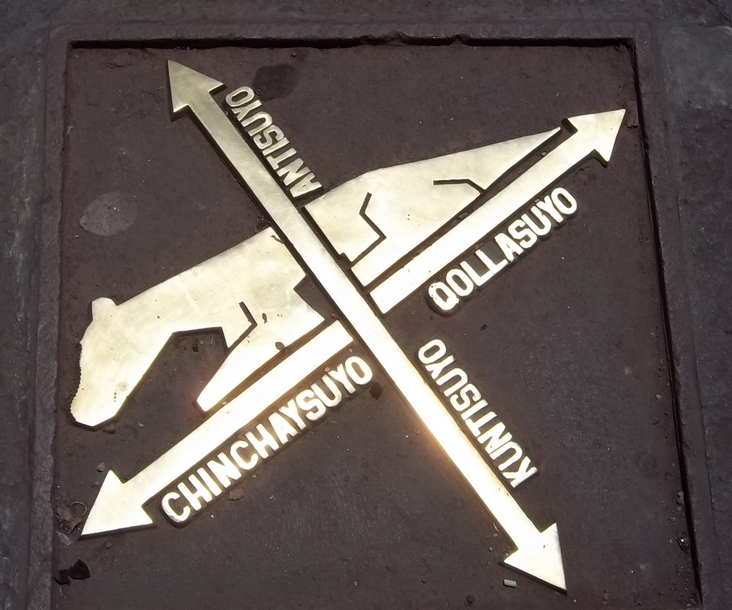
Representation of the four divisions of the Inca Empire (or Tahuantinsuyu), which started from Cusco, the capital city shaped like a cougar.

The Pachacuti ruler is credited with making Cusco a spiritual and political center. Pachacuti came to power in 1438, and he and his son Túpac Yupanqui dedicated five decades to the organization and conciliation of the different tribal groups under his domain, including the Lupacas and the Collas. During the period of Pachacuti and Túpac Yupanqui, the Cusco domain reached Quito, to the north, and to the Maule River, to the south, culturally integrating the inhabitants of 4500 km of mountain ranges.

It is also believed that the original design of the city is the work of Pachacuti. The map of ancient Cusco is shaped like a cougar, with the central Haucaypata square (in the place of the Plaza de Armas) in the position that would occupy the animal's chest. The head of the feline would be located on the hill where the fortress of Sacsayhuamán is.

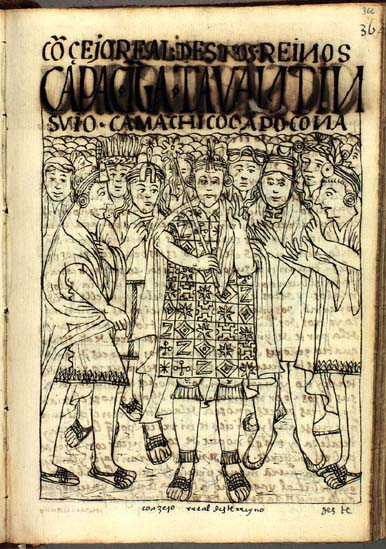
"Royal council of these kingdoms, the Inka lords who govern Tawantinsuyu", painted in 1615 by the Inca Guamán Poma. Royal Danish Library.

The city of Cusco was designed as the seat of power and its internal organization corresponded to a traditional Inca urban division, it was located in a strategic central point of the empire, whose centrality converges the four roads that linked the suyos.

== Viceroyalty era ==
=== Conquest of Cusco ===
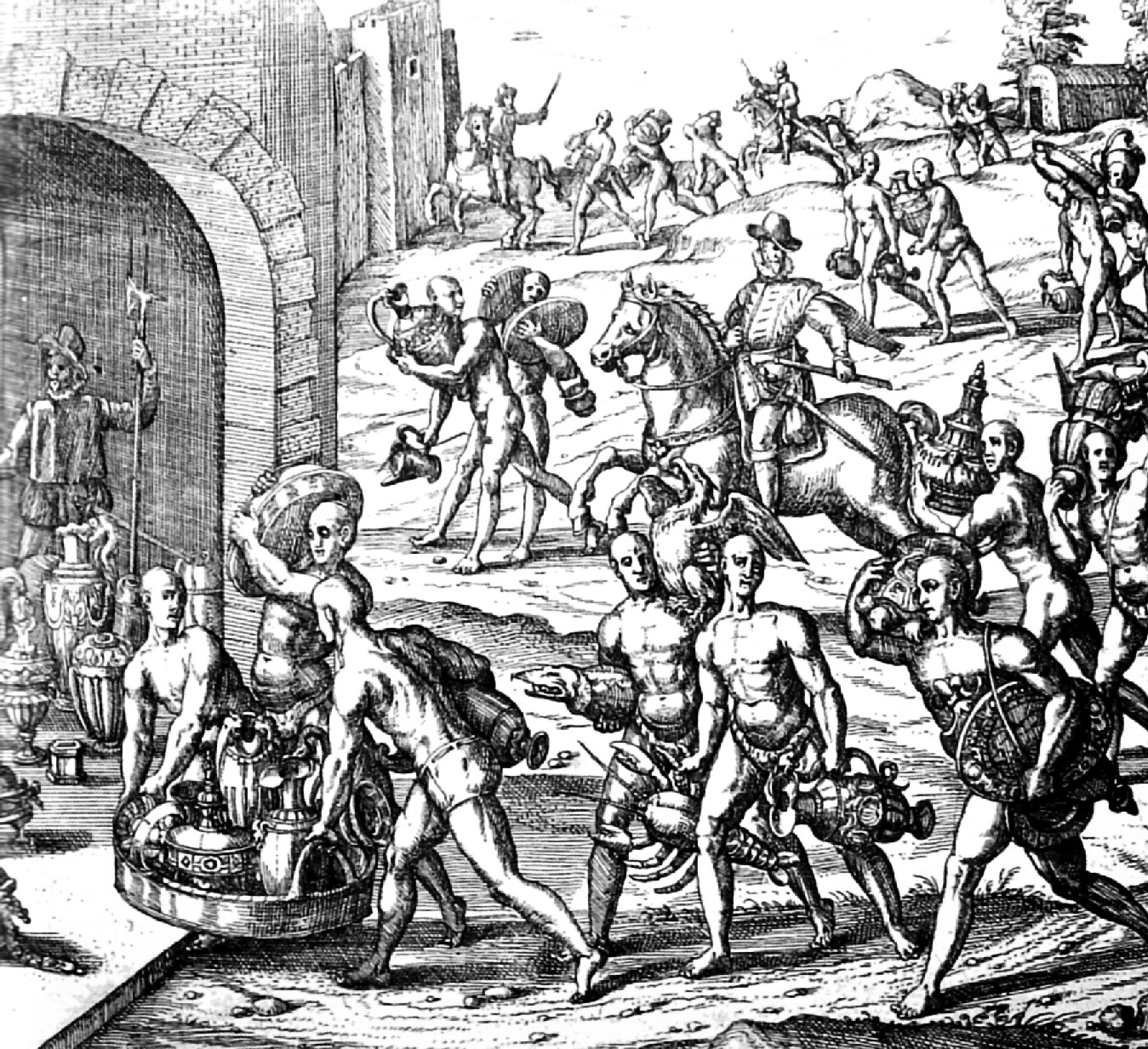
Engraving by Protestant Theodor de Bry, 16th c., "Ramson payment of Atahualpa (c.1502-33) brought to Francisco Pizarro at Cajamarca". Bibliothèque nationale de France.

The Spanish conquistadors knew from their arrival in what is now Peruvian territory, that their goal was to take the city of Cusco, capital of the Inca empire.

Three weeks after the death of the Inca Atahualpa, they began their march towards Cusco. On August 11, 1533, Francisco Pizarro began his trip from Cajamarca to Cusco accompanied by Túpac Huallpa and, although Garcilaso points out that it is another character, the warrior Chalcuchimac. the Spaniards agreed in Xaquixaguana, near the city of Cuzco, to make Manco Cápac as indigenous sovereign, son of Huayna Capac, 20 years old, from Charcas. The young prince was eager to collaborate with the expulsion of Cusco from the troops of the Inca general Quizquiz, Atahualpa's trusted man and defender of a rival panaka. To this end, he supplied the Spaniards and gathered a strong contingent of Cusco citizens, Cañaris and Chankas willing to besiege the capital of the empire. In November 1533, the troops of Quizquiz, fearing to be sieged, left the city and were persecuted until Anta, where they presented battle, but were defeated, fleeing their leader to Paruro.

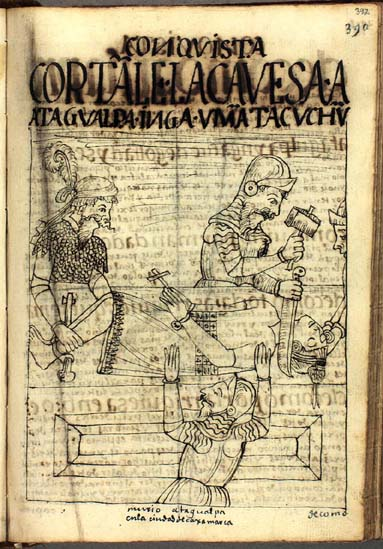
"The execution of Atahualpa Inka in Cajamarca, they behead him", painted in 1615 by the Inca Guamán Poma. Royal Danish Library. Actually he was sentenced to be garroted.

According to Cristóbal de Molina (1553), Francisco Pizarro took possession of Cusco on November 15, 1533, among acclamations of the Cusco citizens for having defeated Atahualpa, the usurper of the throne. However, soon the excitement turned into discontent, when the conquistadores broken into the monuments and sacred places of the Incas, obtaining a city's treasure that according to the scribe of Pizarro, Francisco Xerez (1534), had a total of "580 thousand pesos in gold and 215 thousand marks in silver". They stripped of jewels and rich ornaments from the royal mummies that rested in the Coricancha temple. In a cave near the city they found a large number of vessels of pure gold with figures of snakes, locusts and other animals, also sacked gold life-size staues of women and llamas.

At Christmas, believing to be the object of a compliment of the Spaniards, Túpac Manco, already invested with the mascapaicha with the name of Manco Inca, naively accepted the "requirement" protocol demanded by Charles V, Holy Roman Emperor, recognizing him as supreme sovereign of their domains. He also arranged for his army, some 10,000 soldiers, to leave the city accompanying Hernando Pizarro's expeditions to Huamanga (Ayacucho city).

=== Siege of Cusco ===
While Cusco was under the authority of Juan and Gonzalo Pizarro, Francisco's brothers, Manco Inca created a plan to escape and gather a new army. The first flight was frustrated, but the second, on April 18, 1536, allowed him to take refuge in Yucay. There he managed to gather, according to the chroniclers, about 100,000 men, with whom on May 3, 1536, he sieged Cusco, sending a similar army to Lima, in command from his brother Quizu Yupanqui.

Within the city, 200 conquerors commanded by Hernando, Juan and Gonzalo Pizarro with Nicaraguans and no more than 1,000 Cañaris and Chachas at their service, were reduced to a desperate situation within the framework of the Aucaypata square and which ended with the miracle of Suturhuasi. On May 14, there was a desperate battle for the capture of the fortress of Sacsayhuamán, famous because the Inca captain Cullash, also known as Cahuide, jumped from the top of one of its towers. Manco Inca conducted four offensives to capture Cusco. The last one in August 1536, forced him to withdraw from the project because the time of sowing in the surrounding fields had arrived and it was necessary to avoid the hunger that could occur if the lands were abandoned.

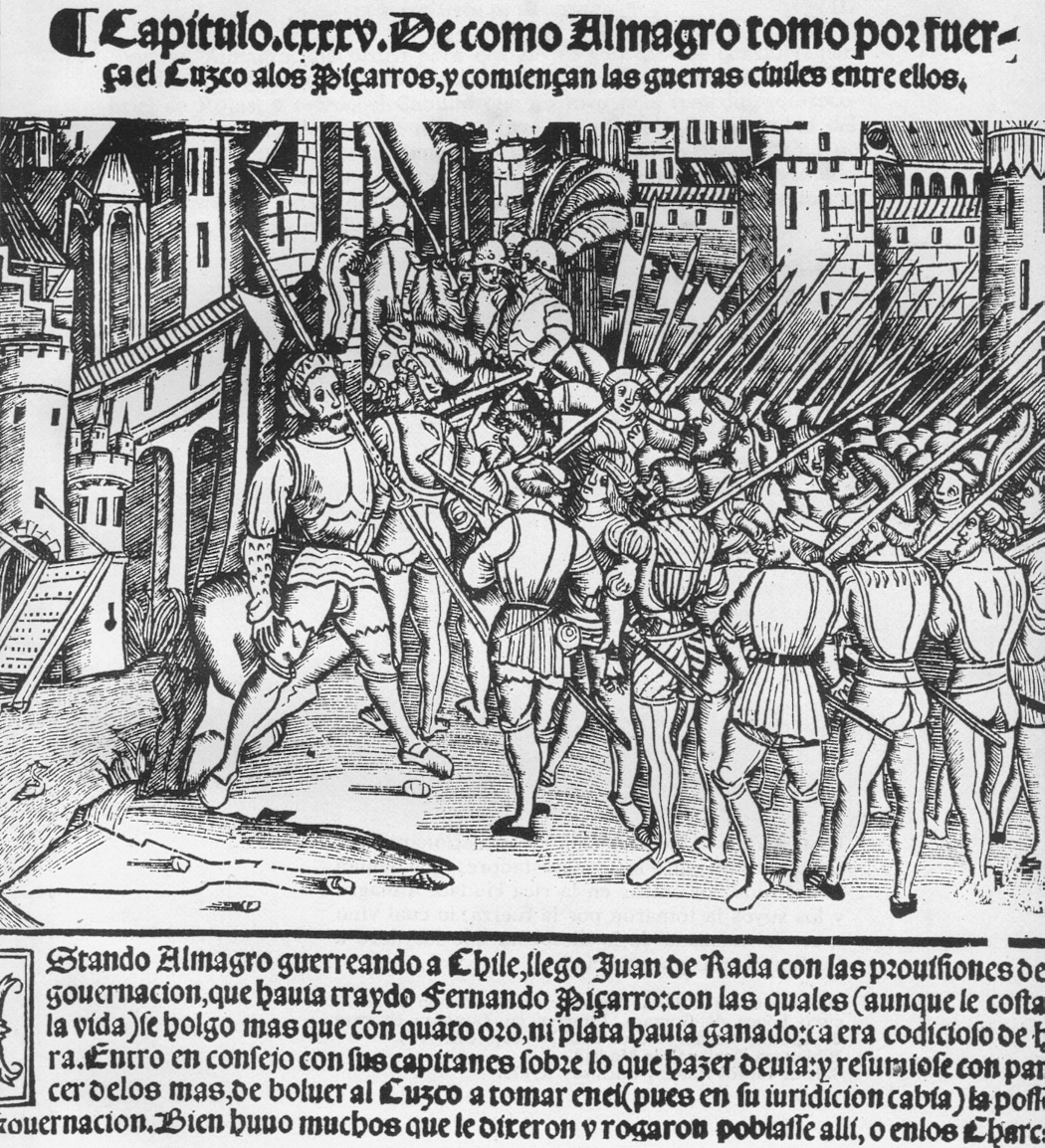
Diego de Almagro entering in Cusco. Engraving of the Historia general de las Indias (1554) by Francisco López de Gómara.

In September, preparing a second siege of Cusco, Tiso Yupanqui, main general of Manco Inca, successfully led several clashes against the Spaniards. The main one happened in front of Ollantaytambo in January 1537. According to an anonymous chronicler from 1539, in that battle Tiso Yupanqui captured "several dozen" of Spaniards and "made them slaves", while also adorning the fortress with "200 heads of Christians and 150 horse leathers".

Failed the expedition to Chile, Diego de Almagro returned to Cusco on May 8, 1537, and imposed his authority over the brothers of Francisco Pizarro, whom he imprisoned them for a few weeks. Then he undertook the campaign against Manco Inca, giving him a severe defeat in Vitcos, a mysterious place that some researchers, such as Juan José Vega (1992), suspect Machu Picchu has been. Then, the rebel Inca fled to Vilcabamba, where he would be killed in 1542 by some Spanish fugitives to whom he gave asylum.

=== Civil wars (1538–1554) ===
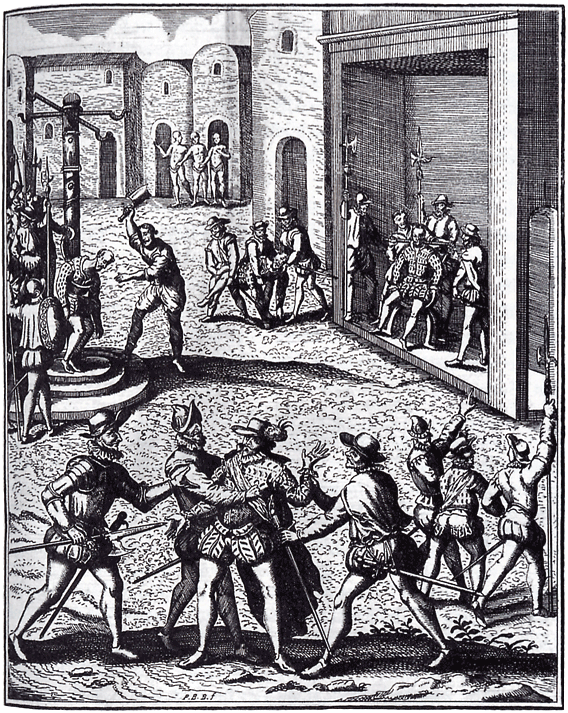
Capture, Trial and Execution of Diego De Almagro in Cusco. Painting by Theodor de Bry. 16h century. Bibliothèque nationale de France. Almagro actually was sentenced to death by to be garroted in his cell.

Diego de Almagro, willing to forcefully defend the territories he considered his own, left Cusco to face the troops led from Lima by Hernando Pizarro, but was defeated in Battle of Las Salinas on April 6, 1538. He returned chained and imprisoned to the old imperial capital, being surprisingly sentenced to the death penalty by to be garroted in his own cell. Produced the execution on July 8, 1538, his beheaded body and his head were exhibited in the main square of Cusco. Only then the royal decree of January 8, 1537 was implemented, which had established Cusco as the seat of the first bishopric, starting with Bishop Vincente de Valverde on September 8, 1538. On June 19, 1540, a royal decree granted Cusco the status of city, coat of arms and the title of "cabeza de los reynos del Perú" (head of the Kingdoms of Peru) and "muy noble, leal y fidelísima gran ciudad del Cuzco" (very noble, loyal and very faithful great city of Cuzco). The banner of the conquest, granted by Charles V, Holy Roman Emperor in Toledo, in 1529, was preserved in the convent of Santo Domingo, in Cusco.

There were still some important battle facts that shook the region. In 1554, Francisco Hernández Girón took up arms; in 1542, Diego de Almagro II was captured and executed in Cusco, a fugitive after the defeat of the Battle of Chupas; in 1548, there was the Revolt of the Encomenderos led by Gonzalo Pizarro, also executed (by death penalty) in the city; In 1572, the last of the Inca rebels, Túpac Amaru, whose death would give rise to the myth of Inkarrí, was executed in the Plaza Mayor of Cusco.

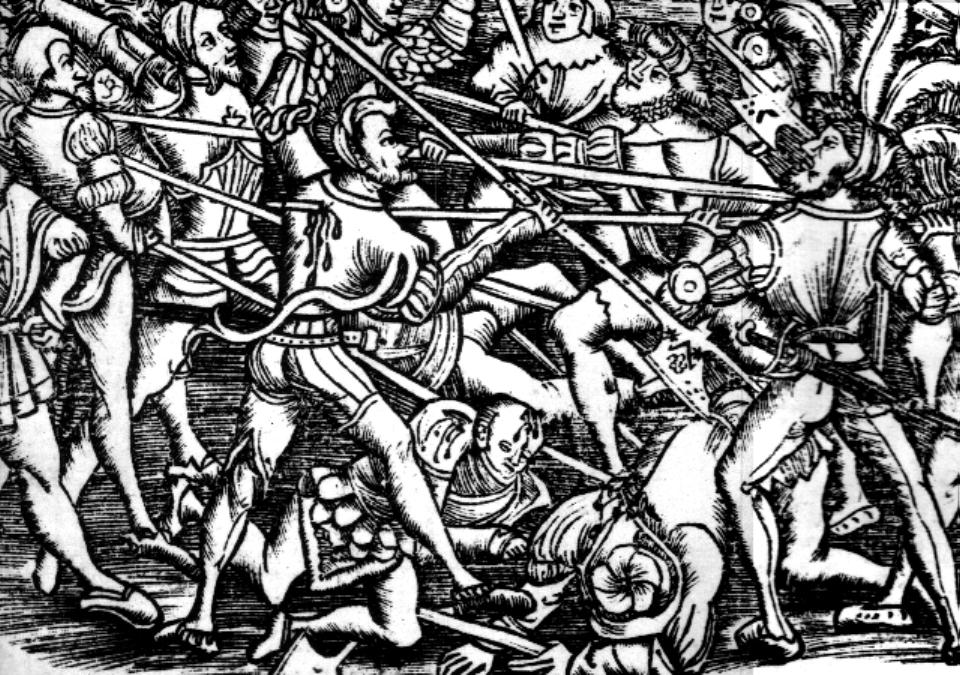
The death of viceroy Blasco Núñez Vela by the army commanded by Gonzalo Pizarro in the Battle of Iñaquito during the Revolt of the Encomenderos. Engraving of the Historia general de las Indias (1554) by Francisco López de Gómara.

The first viceroy, Blasco Núñez Vela (1544–1546), who ruled Peru during the reign of Charles V, Holy Roman Emperor (1516–1556), was the bearer of laws that cut the power and the sistem of the encomenderos and these were not accepted by them. In Cusco, Gonzalo Pizarro rebelled against the Viceroy, obtaining the support of the Real Audiencia of Lima and the cabildos, for which he exercised power as sovereign of the viceroyalty between 1544 and 1548. Backing him from Panama, a certain Hernando de Contreras proclaimed himself as the "King of Peru". The king of Spain's envoy as peacemaker, Pedro de la Gasca (1546–1551) defeated the encomenderos in the Battle of Jaquijahuana on April 9, 1548.

Achieved pacification, Cusco acquired great economic importance throughout the Andean area. It was the knot of the most important roads, such as the one that arrived in Buenos Aires from Lima, after climbing the Andes through the Huancavelica, Huamanga (Ayacucho), Andahuaylas, Cusco, Puno, La Paz, Potosí, Salta, Tucumán and Córdoba. The mining boomed in the Andes thanks to the Cusco-born with the surname Hualca discovered the Potosí mines in Upper Peru. That same year, Huancavelica's mercury mines were discovered, an event as important as the previous one, since then silver was obtained by amalgam of its minerals with mercury. Thus, Potosí or Huancavelica were two reciprocal riches and Cusco was a compulsory bridge between the two, although the Huancavelica-Chincha-Pisco-Arica-Potosí route was also used, where the Pisco-Arica section was made by sea navigation and the remaining ones on horse/mule back. To supply the population dedicated to mining; textile works, agriculture for food and transportation of goods were booming throughout the Cusco region.

=== Colonial splendor ===
The colonial coat of arms of Cusco, created in 1540, with the abstract: "A shield that contains a golden castle in a red field, in memory [of] that the said city and its castle were conquered by force of arms in our service. And by border eight condures, in memory that at the time that the said city was won, came down to eat the notable figures and dead that died in it, which are in the gold field".

In 1560, the year in which the viceroyalty acquires effective tranquility, the young mestizo writer Gómez Suárez de Figueroa, later known as Inca Garcilaso de la Vega departed to Spain in search of better horizons. In 1609, he published in Madrid his memories and investigations about the history of the Incas and the Conquest: the Comentarios Reales de los Incas. Also in 1560, Viceroy Toledo imposed important changes in the political administration of the rural economy with the reductions of Indigenous, special areas of agricultural activity where native communities produced for their own benefit. He set up the community funds of the distributions, savings funds of the naturals themselves, managed by the corregidor, the doctrinero and the cacique. And in 1576, a royal decree forced the hacienda owners to give the Indians land for bread crops and wages in exchange for work offered on the haciendas, also promoting work and commercial activities within the corregimientos. The purpose of these measures was to encourage consumption and currency management among the Indians, and Cusco was the main scope of application of such sistem.

One of the first "born in the Indies" bishops was the canon Friar Luis de Quesada (1553–1594), a Cusco-born Criollo named bishop of his hometown in 1593, but who failed to exercise his position-title for having died on the return journey from the canonical consecration in Madrid.

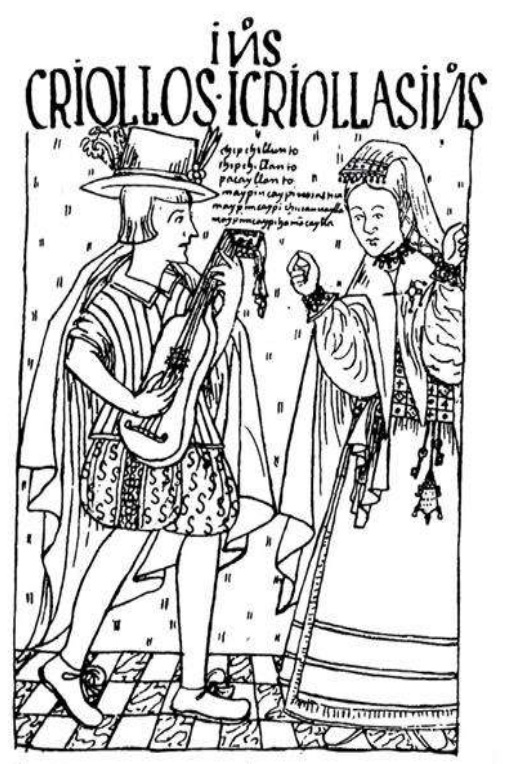
White criollo playing an Inca-language music to an Inca woman in Cusco, painted in 1615 by the Inca Guamán Poma. Royal Danish Library.

In 1598 the Royal College Seminary of San Antonio el Magno was founded in the city of Cusco, by Bishop Antonio de Raya Navarrete. In 1619, the Jesuits established the College of San Bernardo. The University of San Antonio Abad, founded by royal decree of 1692, came into operation in 1696.

In 1546 the construction of the colonial hospitals of Cusco began. That year, the first hospital de Nuestra Señora de la Piedad was inaugurated, which would later be renamed as hospital de San Bartolomé and, as of the 17th century, as hospital de San Juan de Dios after the arrival of the Brothers Hospitallers of Saint John of God. In 1558 the hospital de Naturales was founded. Both were the main hospitals in the city. At the end of the 17th century the Hospital de la Almudena would be established, administered by the Order of the Brothers of Bethlehem.

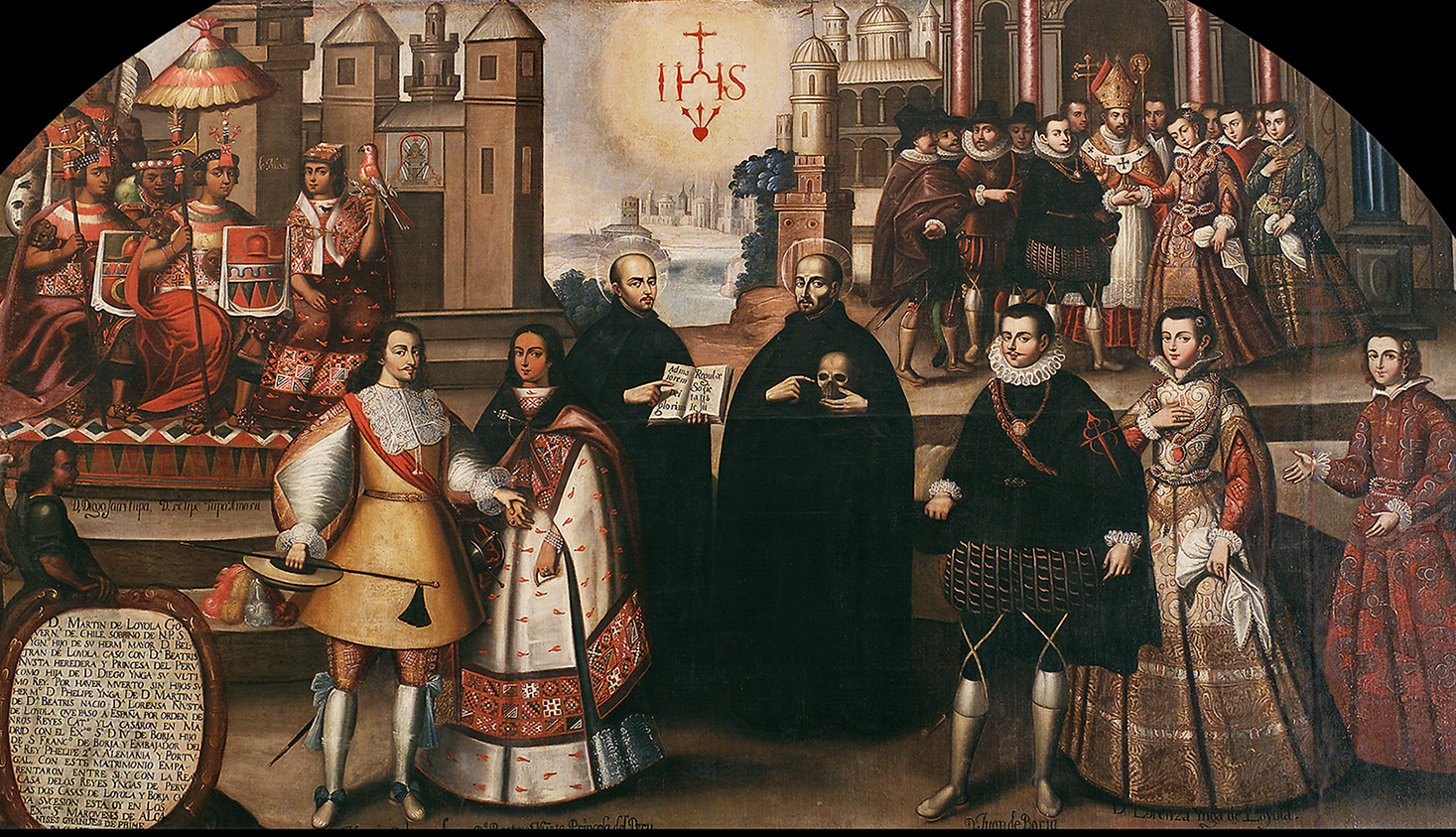
The Marriage of Captain Martín García de Loyola and the Inca ñusta Beatriz Clara Qoya, daughter of Sayri Túpac; parents of the first Marchioness of Oropesa. 17th century painting located in the Church of la Compañía de Jesús, Cusco.

The reform that eradicated the encomienda system had notable exceptions in Cusco. Some of them were allowed to preserve the right of majorat and the collection of taxes on the towns within their jurisdiction. Such was the case of the monastery of Santa Clara in Cusco, which owned the encomienda of Juliaca and retained it until the 18th century. Other notable case was the encomienda of the Marquises of Oropesa (Urubamba) assigned by Philip II of Spain in 1618, to the noble mestiza woman ñusta Ana María García Qoya de Loyola, daughter of the hidalgo Martín García de Loyola and the ñusta Beatriz Clara Qoya, daughter of Sayri Túpac, Inca "rebel" who took advantage of the peace offers of the Viceroy (she also was the niece of Túpac Amaru), whose privilege of majorat affected the regions of San Benito de Alcántara, San Bernardo, Santiago de Oropesa (Urubamba), Yucay and Huayllabamba. The transportation of goods and the flourishing trade allowed the appearance of wealthy criollo landowners, such as Diego de Esquivel y Jaraba, a native of Cusco, who thanks to his fortune could become Marquis of Valleumbroso in the mid-17th century.

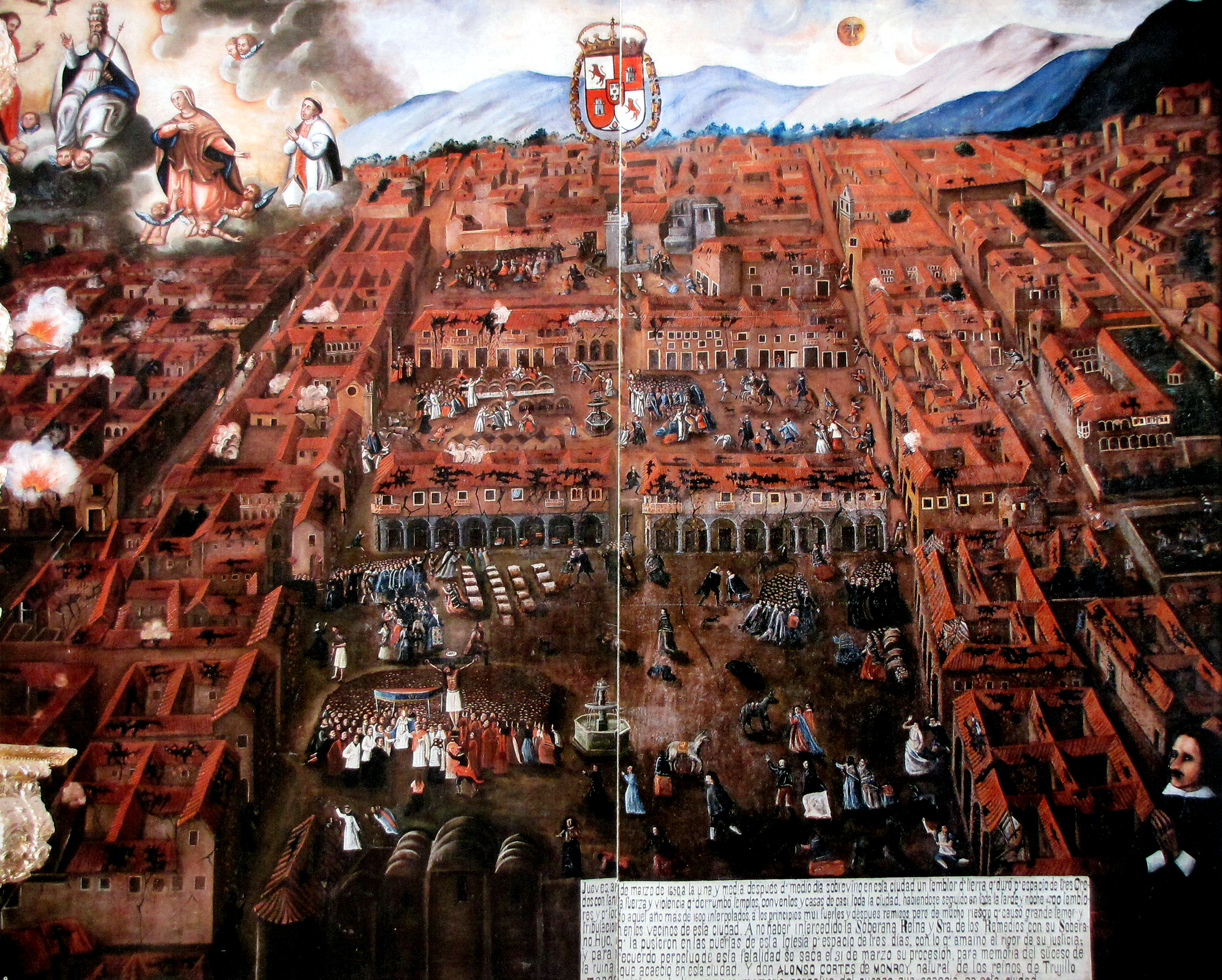
Anonymous 17th century painting showing the 1650 Cusco Earthquake and the appearance that the city presented before this event. The earthquake served to beautify some city's constructions. Located at Cusco Cathedral.

A devastating earthquake in Cusco on March 31, 1650, allowed bold plans to renovate the city, and Spaniard Bishop Manuel de Mollinedo y Angulo was the animator and patron of many important works of art and buildings. He patronaged the construction of the Church of la Almudena, which included a beautiful effigy of the Virgin made by Juan Tomás Tuyro Túpac; It also facilitated the construction of the Church of San Pedro, the headquarters of the University of Saint Anthony the Abbot, in 1669, and the Church of San Sebastián (1678). He was the protector and arts patron of the development of the Cusco School of painting, which had the Quechua Diego Quispe Tito as one of its prominent representatives. The famous pulpit of Church of San Blas, as a tribute, carries the shield of this prelate. Bishop Mollinedo also made possible the constructions of churches in Maras, Juliaca, Paucartambo, Ayaviri, Lampa and Mañaz.

The Cusco Cathedral began to be built in 1538, but due to the effects of the earthquake of 1650, the works were interrupted and it was completed and consecrated in 1735. The convent of Santo Domingo, erected on what was the Inca Inti temple of Coricancha, it was erected in the first years of the conquest, but it had to be rebuilt after the earthquake of 1650. The same happened with the convent of Las Nazarenas (Casa de Serpies), built on the Yachaywasi (school) of the Incas. This same circumstance forced to rebuild the church of la Compañía de Jesús, one of the most beautiful in the Americas (the Jesuits did an important social and educational work, but were expelled from Peru and the entire Spanish Empire in 1767); The basilica of La Merced, the Church of San Sebastián and the Monastery of Santa Catalina de Siena were also rebuilt. The monastery of Santa Clara is one of the few that remained intact after that earthquake. The experience of the earthquake of 1650, allowed to purify the techniques of monumental building, giving rise to portentous religious and secular buildings of Andean Baroque style, as firm as admirable.

Cusco was the most important city of the viceroyalty of Peru until the end of the 17th century when it was eclipsed by the capital Lima.

=== Epidemics ===
During the colony, Cusco also suffered many epidemics. Between April and November 1720, a terrible feverish wave caused 40,000 deaths in the provinces of the same Bishopric while, 20,000 in the city of Cusco, in some days in Cusco, such as August 10 of that year, up to 700 deaths. Even today it has not been possible to clarify what disease that was. The chronicles of the time speak of a malarial fever called tabardillo. Faced with so many dead, it built a cemetery of a ravine was later called Ayahuayco. The tragedy inspired an anonymous wall painting in the church of Catca, in Quispicanchi.

The rise of mining activity in Huancavelica and Potosí generated an important migration of mita mineworkers for the work and the transportation of goods, whose the latters the center of operations was Cusco. Alonso Carrió de la Vandera says in his Lazarillo de ciegos caminantes desde Buenos Aires hasta Lima (1773) that Cusco, throughout the 18th century, was "a very populated city, of great human movement and sustained transportation of goods".

== Independence ==
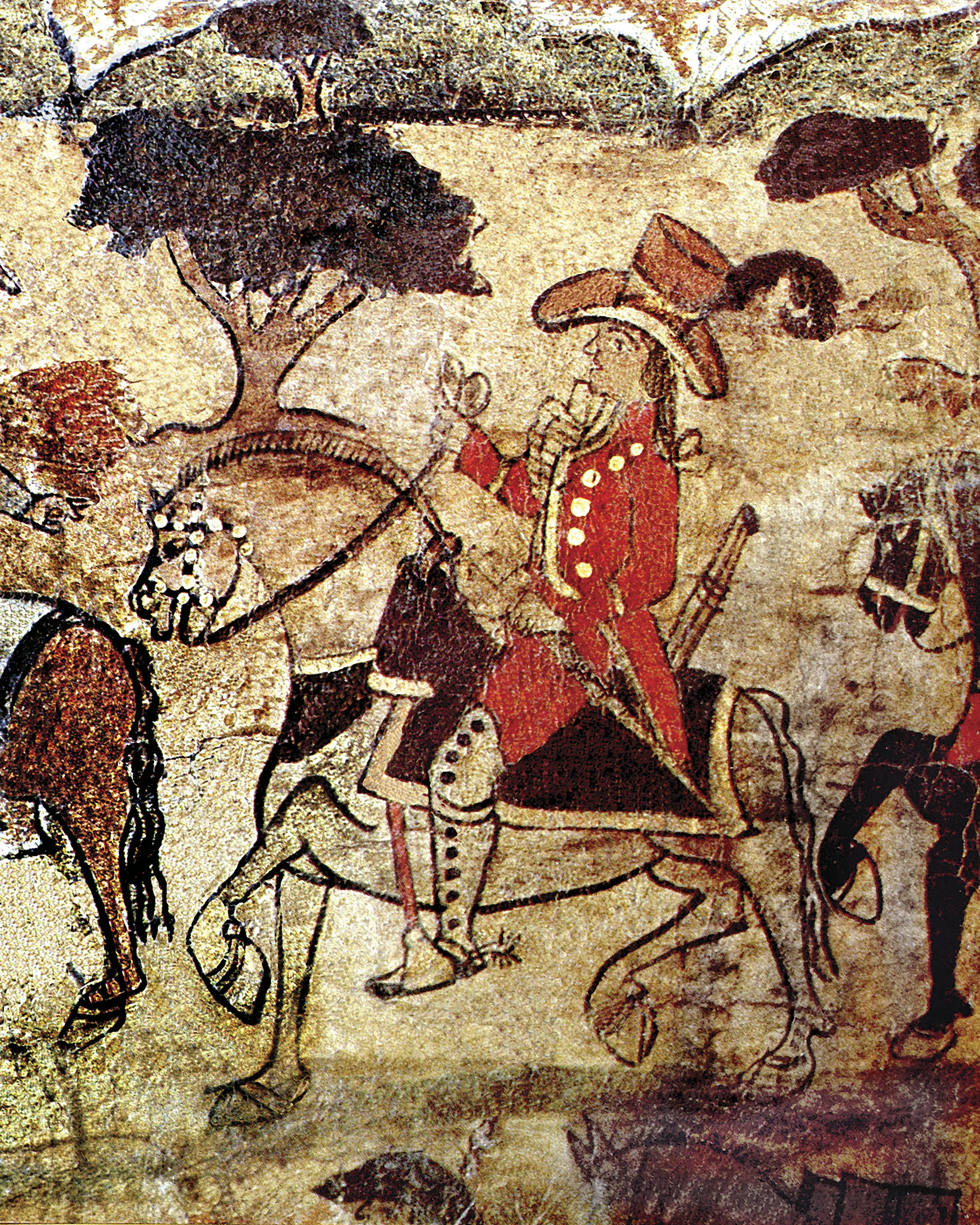
Rebellion of Túpac Amaru II, a mural painted in 1802 by Tadeo Escalante

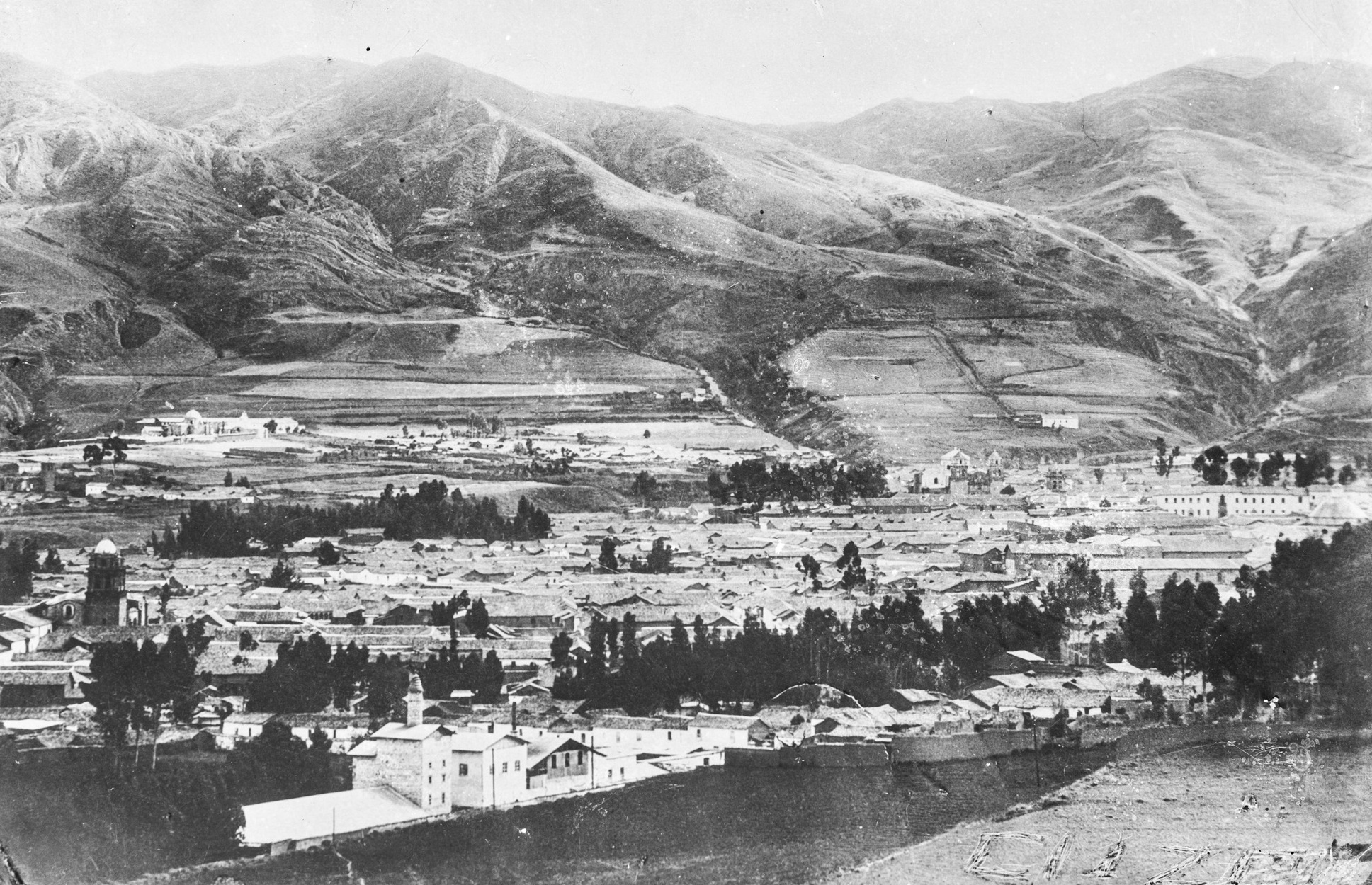
Panoramic view of Cusco in 1897

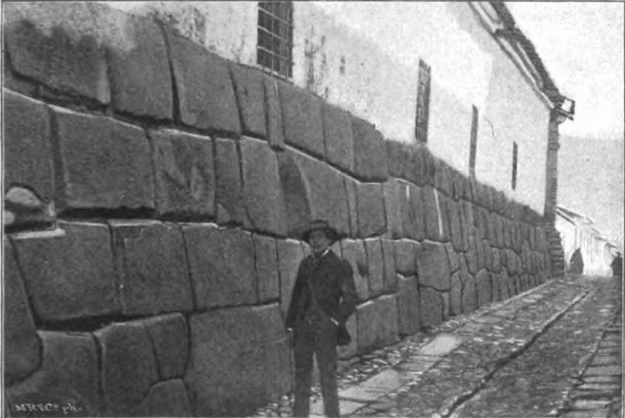
Cusco in 1885. Photo by Ernst W. Middendorf.

As a result of the Bourbon Reforms and, also because of the Potosí's mita system of mandatory unpaid personal services and abuse of corregidores and judges toward mineworkers, in 1780 the city of Cusco was convulsed by the movement initiated by the cacique José Gabriel Condorcanqui, better known as Túpac Amaru II, that rose against the Spanish administration. His uprising was suppressed after several months of fighting in which he put the viceroyalty authorities stationed in Cusco in check. Túpac Amaru II was defeated, taken prisoner and executed with almost all his family in the Plaza de Armas of Cusco. Even today, the chapel that served as prison to the hero remains on the side of the church of la Compañía de Jesús. This movement rapidly expanded throughout the Andes and influenced the South American emancipatory process. Under this revolution the Real Audiencia of Cusco was established and there was a migration of several noble families of Spaniards to the cities of Lima and Arequipa fearful of indigenous reactions. These migrations, together with the commercial decay generated by the creation of the Viceroyalty of the Río de la Plata that removed a leading role to the city as a crossing point for travelers and merchants, explain the decay suffered by the city in the 19th century.

The defeat of Túpac Amaru II did not diminish the libertarian concerns in Cusco. In 1805, Gabriel Aguilar, Manuel Ubalde and other leaders conspired to undermine the Spanish might. On October 9 and November 5, 1813, José and Vicente Angulo, José Gabriel Béjar, Pedro Tudela and Juan Carvajal attempted to rise in arms in Cusco (Rebellion of Cuzco), seconded by Peruvian officers of the Royalist army linked to the Argentine patriotic army of Manuel Belgrano, who was fighting in Upper Peru. On August 3, 1814, they achieved their purpose, making the first proclamation of the independence of Spanish power and organized a military campaign in three fronts: Huamanga (Ayacucho), Arequipa and the Upper Peru, with Brigadier Mateo Pumacahua as revolutionary military chief. After a successful advance of several months the libertarian effort was frustrated by the military expertise of the Royalists, who defeated the insurgents in the Battle of Umachiri, on February 12, 1815. On April 21, in Cusco, Pumacahua and the main insurgent leaders were executed.

On the eve of the independence, the Intendancy of Cuzco, formed in 1784, included the provinces of Cusco, Abancay, Aymaraes, Calca-Lares, Urubamba, Cotabambas, Paruro, Chumbivilcas, Tinta (originally called Canas-Canchis), Quispicanchi and Paucartambo. The population of the intendancy did not vary much in the independence era, from 216,282 inhabitants in 1796 (according to the census of Viceroy Francisco Gil de Taboada, who ruled the Viceroyalty of Peru during the reign of Charles IV of Spain), to 216,382 in May 1822, on the occasion of the elections to the first Republican Congress.

== See also ==
- Atahualpa, the last Inca king
