= Diego Centeno =

Spanish conquistador

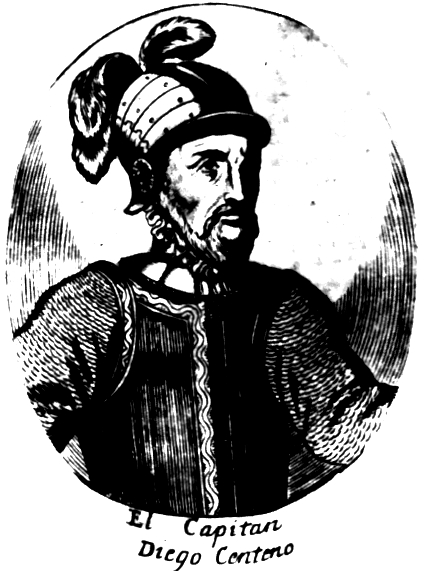
Diego Centeno

Diego Centeno (1514 Ciudad Rodrigo - 9 July 1549 Chuquisaca, Bolivia) was a Spanish conquistador. He arrived to South America and the recently conquered Inca Empire in 1534 at the age of 20, followed by, among others, Pedro de Alvarado, conqueror of Guatemala. In the ensuring battles between the Pizarro brothers and the Almagristas led by Diego de Almagro and, after his defeat and execution in 1538, by his son, Centeno took the party of Pizarro and New Castile. After the downfall of both parties, Diego fought with the Spanish royal forces of Pedro de la Gasca after the defeat and death of Blasco Núñez Vela on the hands of Gonzalo Pizarro. He was defeated in the battle of Huarina by Francisco de Carvajal but managed to reunite with de la Gasca and defeat the forces of Gonzalo and de Carvajal in the battle of Jaquijahuana.
