= Battle of Huarina =

1547 battle

- Part of the Spanish conquest of Peru
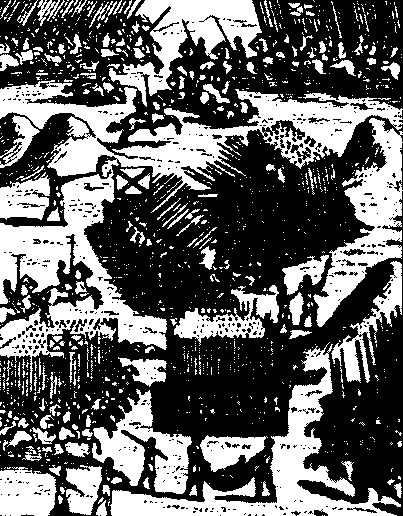
- Engraving from the “Décadas” by Antonio de Herrera y Tordesillas.
Date	October 20, 1547
Location	Huarina, later Bolivia
Result	Nueva Castilla victory

Belligerents
Viceroyalty of Peru	Nueva Castilla

Commanders and leaders
Diego Centeno	Francisco de Carvajal, Gonzalo Pizarro

Strength
750 infantry, 250 cavalry	480

Casualties and losses
450 dead, ~350 wounded	100 dead

After sending away the royally appointed governor of the Viceroyalty of Peru, Blasco Núñez Vela and later defeating and killing him in the battle of Añaquito, Gonzalo Pizarro assembled an army of 1,200 men to press claims for the rule over Peru, once belonging to him and his brothers. The new viceroy, Pedro de la Gasca, landed in Peru in 1547, and a contingent of his troops, led by Diego Centeno, was severely defeated at Huarina by Francisco de Carvajal (dubbed the Demon of the Andes, for his treatment of native Peruvians in his quest for glory and power.)

Centeno, however, remained successful in retreating in order and later united with the main force under de la Gasca. Ultimately, the viceroy won the cause of most of Gonzalo Pizarro's officers and men, and on April 9, 1548, the pizarrists were finally overthrown in the battle of Jaquijahuana.
