= Hernán Bueno y Zea the Younger =

Hernán Bueno y Zea
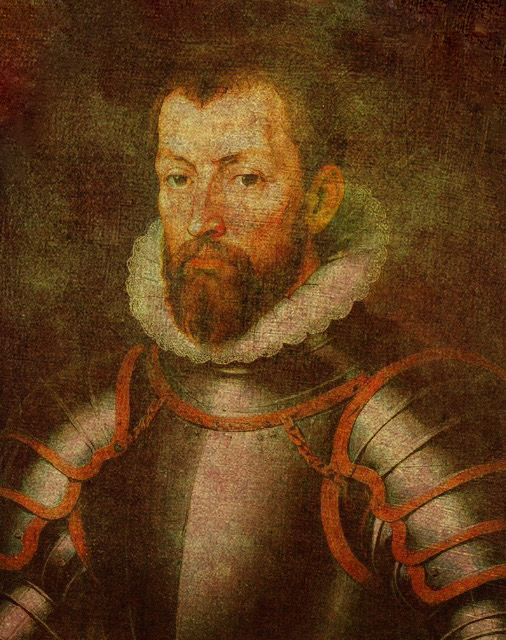
- Portrait of Bueno the Younger.

Mayor of Arequipa
- In office 1566–1567
- Preceded by: Juan de San Juan
- Succeeded by: Nicolás de Almoazán y León
- In office 1570–1571
- Preceded by: Pedro Melgar
- Succeeded by: Martín López de Carvajal
- In office 1576–1577
- Preceded by: Gómez Hernández
- Succeeded by: Hernando Álvarez de Carmona

Personal details
- Born: Hernán Bueno y Zea c. 1514 Aranda de Duero, Spain
- Died: 9 May 1596 Moquegua, Peru
- Party: Royalist
- Spouse: Jerónima de Arana Cárdenas y Carabantes
- Parent(s): Hernán Bueno y Zea the Elder; Beatriz Gascón García Zea

Hernán Bueno y Zea (c. 1514 – 9 May 1596) was a Spanish conquistador, settler, and encomendero that had an influential role in the Viceroyalty of Peru, serving as Mayor of Arequipa in 1566, 1570, and 1576. He was the son of Hernán Bueno, the Elder, a native of Peñafiel, settler and conquistador of the Catari Valley, located in the headwaters of the Moquegua Valley. To distinguish the two, Spanish American historians refer to him as Mozo (the Younger).

== Biography ==
A native of Aranda de Duero, Burgos, Bueno was born around 1514 to Hernán Bueno, the Elder and Beatriz Gascón García Zea, a native of Aranda. He traveled to Peru before 1534, at about twenty years of age, to reunite with his parents. He was one of the first settlers of the city of Lima after its founding by Francisco Pizarro. Governor Pizarro, after founding the city, distributed plots of land among the first settlers, granting one to Bueno. He participated in the Peruvian civil wars; initially, he sided with the rebel army. Later, he fled Arequipa and, after traveling two hundred leagues on horseback, joined Pedro de la Gasca in Piura after being escaping the persecution of Gonzalo Pizarro. Bueno fought under La Gasca until the country was pacified in the 1540s and 1550s. Like his father, he was one of the founders of Arequipa, where he was granted an encomienda with indigenous people.

La Gasca rewarded Bueno's service in 1548 by granting him the Altos de Carumas, previously allocated to his father under a decree by Cristóbal Vaca de Castro. This encomienda included around 800 individuals: “The allocation to Hernán Bueno, which he holds under Vaca de Castro’s decree, consists of 300 indigenous people; they are located twenty leagues from the town towards Potosí. It includes coca and maize”. After the Battle of Jaquijahuana, when La Gasca redistributed land, this land was granted to Bueno the Younger, on 20 November 1549.

In 1557, Viceroy Andrés Hurtado de Mendoza confirmed the encomienda, which provided over 368 pesos annually from the taxes paid by Taena peoples. Bueno resided in the Moquegua Valley, specifically in the area known as Cochuna in the Colesuyo district.

== Marriage and issue ==
Bueno married the daughter of Fernando de Cárdenas y Zapata and María Catalina de Caravantes y Arana, Jerónima de Arana Cárdenas y Carabantes, in Arequipa in 1560. They had six children: Hernando Bueno de Arana (heir to his estate and home on the corner of Mercaderes Street), Cristóbal, Pedro Bueno de Arana, Beatriz de Arana, Inés de Vellamizar Bueno de Arana, and Clara Bueno de Arana.

== Death ==
He made his will on May 9, 1596, in Moquegua, where he died. His remains were transferred to Arequipa, as per his wishes, and buried in the Santo Domingo Church, which he and his wife had helped establish, as documented in records from the Santo Domingo convent archive in Lima.
