= Hernán Bueno the Elder =

Hernán Bueno (c. 1470 – 20 October 1547) was a Spanish conquistador, encomendero, settler, and the patriarch of a petty dynasty in Moquegua, Peru. Hernán was one of three brothers in Peru in the1530s, the other two others were sailors Juan and Martín Bueno. The father of Hernán Bueno, the Younger, he established a powerful lineage in the Southern Viceroyalty of Peru. Many distinguished families from the area as late as the 19th century descended from Bueno and his son. He was also a Captain and military officer, serving under Pedro de la Gasca in the civil war against the Pizarro brothers. To disntinguish him from his son, Spanish American historians tend to call him el Viejo (the Elder).

== Biography ==
Bueno, like his brother, was a native of Peñafiel. He married Beatriz Gascón García Zea from Aranda del Duero, Burgos. Their only known child was Hernán el Mozo (the Younger), also born in Aranda probably around 1514. It is not clear if Bueno's wife and son traveled with him to Peru or if he sent for them after he was settled in Arequipa. It is claimed, however, that Bueno came to Peru "with his son and he fought in the most bloody combats, and also took part in the principal revolts between the conquerors" according to historian Rómulo Cúneo y Vidal. Bueno was one of the earliest settlers of Arequipa in 1539, where he owned a large residence in the center of the city at the corner of Mercaderes Street. In 1542, he was awarded the encomienda in Carumas by Governor Cristóbal Vaca de Castro.

Bueno accompanied Pizarro from Cajamarca to Cusco and participated in the 1534 expedition from Cusco to the Lake Titicaca region. During his explorations, Martín Bueno discovered the area of Carumas, also known as the “valley of Catari”, in the sierras of what is now Moquegua. In 1535 or 1536 he may have returned to Spain a wealthy man from his share of the spoils of Atahualpa’s ransom and, one might speculate, an encomienda in Carumas. Martín is said to have returned to Peru and died in 1538 in the Battle of Salinas, fighting on Pizarro’s side against the rebellion of Diego de Almagro.

Bueno was killed on 20 October 1547, at the Battle of Huarina, fighting on the royalist side during the rebellions of the Pizarro brothers.
