= Pedro Gutiérrez de Santa Clara =

Pedro Gutiérrez de Santa Clara (Mexico, 1522?-1603) was a New Spain chronicler of Creole or mestizo origin. He arrived in Peru in 1543 and witnessed the civil wars between the conquerors of Peru. He wrote a chronicle about it entitled Historia de las guerras más que civiles que hubo en el Reino del Perú (History of the More Than Civil Wars in the Kingdom of Peru), which remained unpublished for many years and was recently published in six volumes between 1904 and 1929.

== Biography ==
His biography is obscure; only a few details of his life are known, which he himself included in his written work. He was born around 1522 in Mexico City. He was the son of a Spanish conquistador who participated in the conquest of Mexico. Luis Alberto Sánchez says that he was probably mestizo, although he also defines him as Creole-Mexican.

It is believed that he moved to Peru around 1543, as he is reported to have been present during Gonzalo Pizarro's march from Cuzco to Lima, during the prelude to the civil war from 1544 to 1548 (the so-called "Great Rebellion" or rebellion of the encomenderos).He was a soldier of Pablo de Meneses, a supporter of Viceroy Blasco Núñez Vela.He possibly witnessed the viceroy's death and, together with Meneses, went over to the Pizarro side.
