= De thesauris in Peru =

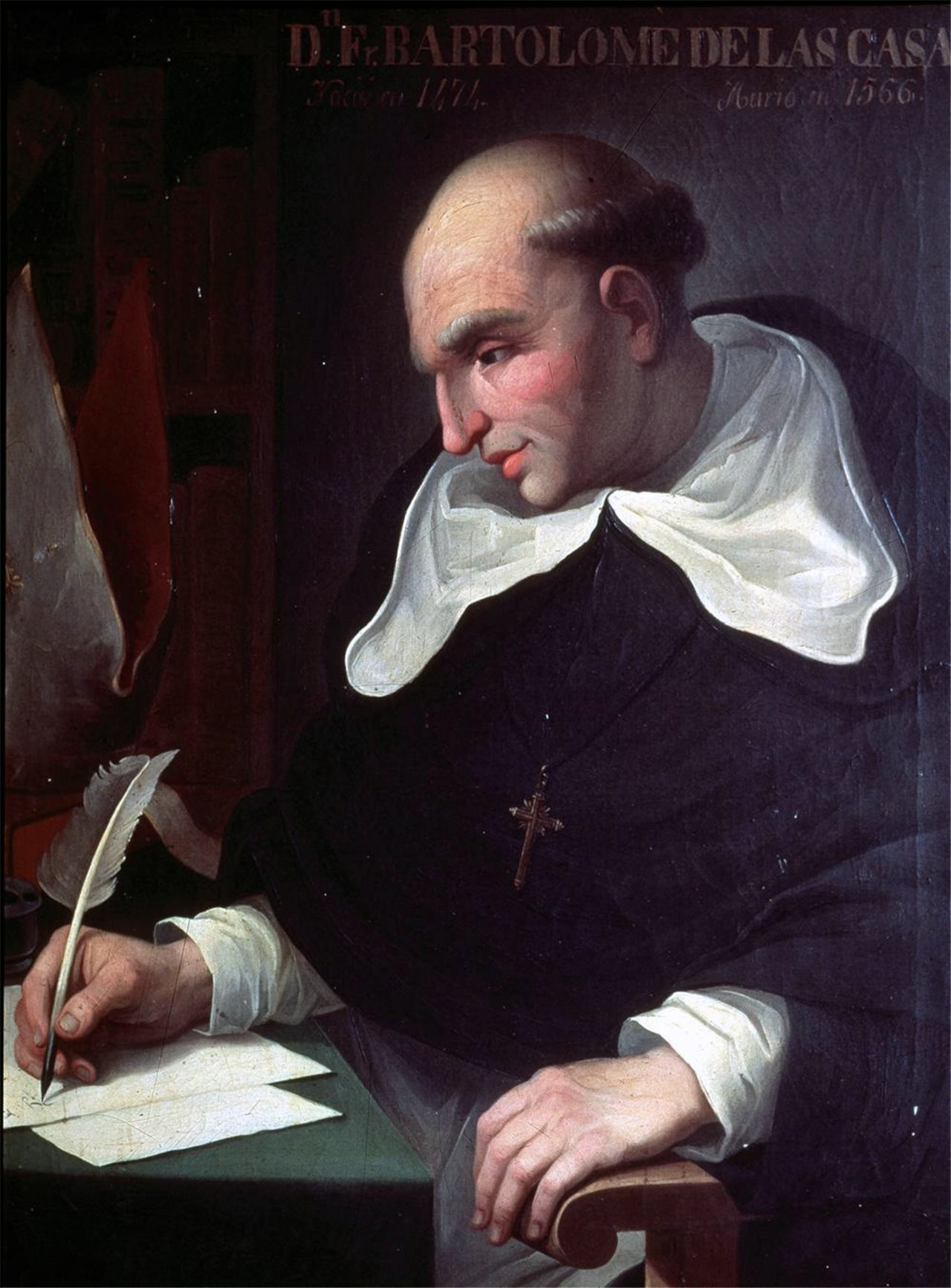
Bartolomé de las Casas

De Thesauris in Peru is a treatise by Spanish Dominican priest and reformer Bartolomé de las Casas (1484 – July 17, 1566), who was the first resident Bishop of Chiapas. In it, one of his last works before his death, he vigorously defended the rights of the native peoples of Peru against the slavery imposed by the early Spanish Conquest. The work also questioned Spain's right to take the gold and silver acquired from the ransom paid to free Atahualpa, the Inca sovereign emperor, as well as valuables looted from the burial sites of the indigenous population.

As a settler in New Spain, he was appalled by the behaviour of the conquistadors towards the Native Americans. In De thesauris in Peru, which was dedicated to King Philip II of Spain, Las Casas wrote that when he had first reached the New World he had supported the atrocities, but had soon become sure that these acts would lead to the collapse of Spain itself in an act of Divine retribution. According to Las Casas, it was the duty of the Spanish to convert the Indians, who would then be loyal subjects of Spain, rather than to kill them. To remove the burden of slavery from them, Las Casas suggested that Africans should be brought to America instead, although he later decided against this when he saw how Africans were affected by slavery and confessed in his Historia de la Indias that he fell into error because he believed that Portuguese African expeditions had been a just war.

== See also ==
- Bartolomé de las Casas
- New Laws
