= Francisco Hernández Girón =

Spanish conquistador

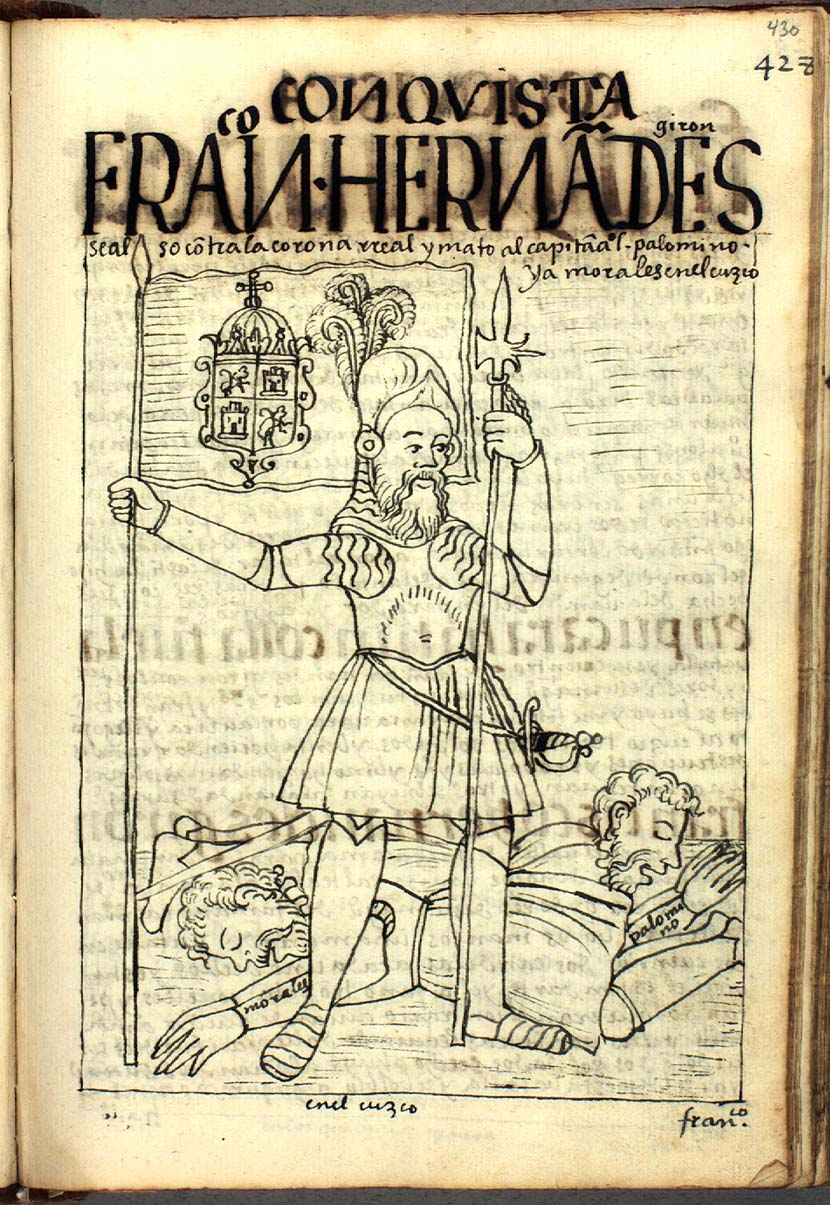
The rebel Francisco Hernández Girón in a drawing of Guamán Poma.

Francisco Hernández Girón, born in Cáceres, Extremadura, died in Lima on December 7, 1554, was a Spanish conquistador.

Hernández Girón arrived in Peru in 1535 with, among others, the future governor Blasco Núñez Vela. In the ensuing struggle for power between the Pizarro brothers and the Almagristas in 1537, he supported neither. Almagro was executed in 1538 and Francisco Pizarro, governor of Peru, was assassinated by Almagro's son in 1541. In the struggle following once next governor Cristóbal Vaca de Castro had defeated the Almagristas at Chupas and then becoming imprisoned by Blasco Núñez Vela, appointed royal viceroy, Hernández Girón became a supporter of the latter.

He fought at the battles of Añaquito and managed to escape death in an emerging defeat. At Jaquijahuana, he again took the side of the royal forces under Pedro de la Gasca, with great success. On November 13, 1553, however, he led a rebellion towards the new rule caused by unequal charges proclaimed by Melchor Bravo de Saravia, the new viceroy and second to follow. He was defeated on December 7, 1554, and executed in Lima.
