= Toledo Reforms =

The Toledo Reforms were a series of reforms implemented by Francisco Álvarez de Toledo to Spain's policies in the Viceroyalty of Peru in the 1570s.

The years 1533–1569 were considered the years of crisis and turmoil in the Viceroyalty of Peru. During these years there were several problems that emerged and that needed serious attention. The Spanish conquistadors found it hard to maintain order in the Andes. The problems that emerged during this time were the New Laws of 1542 that were established by Blasco Núñez Vela and the weakening of the encomienda system. These laws were established to put an end to the exploitation of Amerindians by the establishment of a fair taxation system. This angered the Spaniards because they felt that it was a direct interference in the lands that they won by force and because the laws hurt them from an economical standpoint. The weakening of the encomienda system also hurt the Spaniards economically. The New Laws reverted the encomienda to the King from the original holders who, had originally, wanted to pass them onto their descendants creating an almost aristocratic lineage. However, the King did not want their power and desire for it to get out of check. This system was weakened by competition from other Spanish economic ventures, tax and labor burdens of the encomenderos, and the spread of European epidemic diseases amongst the Andean peoples. This economic crisis needed serious attention.

To deal with the emerging problems, King Philip II of Spain named Francisco de Toledo, as the new Viceroy of Peru in 1568. During his twelve-year rule, he established reforms that he felt would deal with the economic crisis in the Andes. Francisco de Toledo's reforms dealt with 3 key issues. The first was organizing the indigenous peoples into large towns called reducciones. The reducciones were then divided into 614 administrative districts called repartimientos. Each repartimiento was headed by a kuraka. The second issue was imposing a regularized system of taxation which was the tribute tax. The tax amount was very high. The tribute was to be paid by all indigenous men between the ages of 18 and 50 and the amount to be paid was based on the social status of the payer. The kurakas were exempt from paying the tribute and were responsible for collecting the tribute. The final issue was the establishment of a system of forced labor called the mita. The forced labor was used to work in the mercury and silver mines of Peru and Upper Peru. This system was established so that the wealth gained from these mines could be transferred to Spain.
