= Battle of Iñaquito =

1546 Part of the Spanish conquest of Peru

- Part of the Spanish conquest of Peru
Date	January 18, 1546
Location	Iñaquito, near Quito, present-day Ecuador
Result	Victory for Nueva Castilla

Belligerents
Nueva Castilla	Viceroyalty of Peru

Commanders and leaders
Gonzalo Pizarro; Francisco de Carvajal	Blasco Núñez Vela †; Francisco Hernández Girón

Strength
700	~300 infantry, 140 cavalry

Casualties and losses
7 dead (Pizarro's claim)	100–200 dead

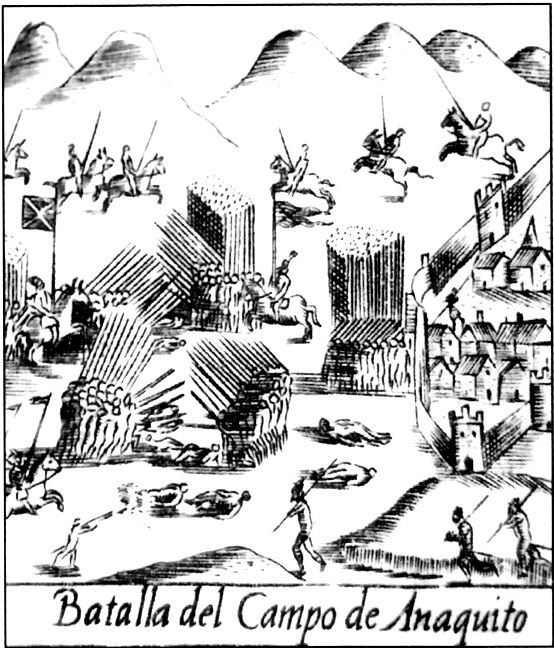
Battle of Añaquito: Engraving depicting the Battle of Iñaquito or Añaquito (January 18, 1546)

After his unheard claims as governor of New Castile (Peru) following the death of his brother, Gonzalo Pizarro pressed claims to be recognized as the ruler of the land he and his brothers had conquered. After the arrival of appointed royal viceroy Blasco Núñez Vela in 1544, Gonzalo succeeded to have him repelled and sent to Panama in chains. He was released, however, and returned to Peru by sea while Gonzalo was mustering an army. The two met on January 18 at Iñaquito in the outskirts of Quito, present-day capital of Ecuador, where the superiority of the Nueva Castilla army ensured victory for Gonzalo. Blasco Núñez Vela reportedly fought but fell as a victim in battle and was later decapitated on the field of defeat, a fate Gonzalo himself would share two years later at Jaquijahuana.

== Background ==
In 1542, The position Viceroy of Peru and the Royal Audience of Lima were created, and the next year Viceroy Blasco Núñez Vela and the new judges of the Royal Audience arrived at Peru. The said viceroy arrived with the strong intention of enforcing the recently enacted New Laws that abolished the encomienda prohibited the personal labor of the indigenous people. The encomenderos (the masters) protested and organized a rebellion, choosing Gonzalo Pizarro as leader, who was then a wealthy encomendero in Charcas (present-day Bolivia)

Gonzalo went to Cuzco, where he was magnificently received and proclaimed Attorney General of Peru to protest the New Laws before the Viceroy and, if necessary, before the Emperor Charles V himself (1544).

In Lima, the viceroy Núñez Vela was hated for his capriciousness, even to the extreme of killing a prominent resident of the city, an administrator by the name of Illán Suárez de Carbajal, with his own hands. The judges of the Royal Audience, in their eagerness to gain popularity, were inclined to defend the rights of the encomenderos and take the Viceroy prisoner. On September 18, 1544, they sent him back to Spain.

Gonzalo Pizarro triumphantly entered Lima on October 28, 1544, followed by 1200 soldiers. The judges, somewhere between joyous and fearful, received him as Governor of Peru. The rebellion against the Spanish crown was already a fact. The leader enjoyed popular support; his men called him the Great Gonzalo, and the uprising with the "Great Rebellion".

Meanwhile, the Viceroy managed to escape, by convincing his keeper, the judge Juan Álvarez, to set him free. He landed at Tumbes, on the northern coast of Peru, and headed to Quito, where he formed a new army. With these forces he marched south, to confront Gonzalo's rebels.

== Preliminary movements ==
The Viceroy occupied San Miguel de Piura and continued south. Aware of these movements, Gonzalo left Lima with his forces and went north, arriving at Trujillo. The viceroy retreated then, fearing the power of his adversary, and returned to Quito at a forced march. The journey was long and tiring, all the while being closely pursued by Gonzalo, without fighting or fighting very little. Later they went further north, towards Popayán (present-day Colombia).

Meanwhile, Captain Diego Centeno revolted in Charcas (Bolivia), raising the flag of the King. From Quito, Gonzalo Pizarro ordered Francisco de Carvajal to tackle this new campaign front, while Gonzalo was awaiting the viceroy.

In the meantime, the viceroy remained concentrated in Popayán, where he received reinforcements from the north; one of the captains who joined with him was Sebastián de Benalcázar, the governor of Popayán. While he was winning the support of the native chiefs in the region, whose work was invaluable, as they left the followers of Pizarro, thus increasing the impatience that Pizarro's men were suffering due to the prolonged inactivity. There was only one skirmish at a place called Río Caliente.

It was then that Pizarro planned an intelligent strategy to draw the viceroy out of Popayán, a position that he was finding difficult to attack: leaving a small garrison in Quito, under the command of Pedro de Puelles, Pizarro appeared to march south with his entire army, instructing their indigenous allies to spread the story that he was marching to aid Carvajal against Centeno. The viceroy was deceived and soon after moved his troops out of Popayán with the intent to seize Quito. He did not expect that the rebel leader instead of going south had stationed his men three leagues from Quito, along the river Guallabamba. The spies didn't catch the ruse until they reached Otavalo. Since it was too late to head back, so the viceroy withheld this news from his troops, so as not to discourage them, and continued to advance, already deciding to go to battle. Thus he came to the bank of the Guallabamba that faced the position of the rebels. It was too advantageous, the reason being that Benalcázar had advised the viceroy to divert to Quito by a less-traveled road, a plan which the viceroy accepted.

Sad was the reception given to the viceroy in Quito, where there were women who, knowing the military superiority of Gonzalo, reproached the viceroy for having "gone there only to die." The superior of the Franciscans, who was also pessimistic, offered refuge for Blasco Núñez in his convent and invited Benalcázar to retire as soon as possible, propositions which were ignored. Meanwhile, Pizarro's troops had also taken the road to Quito. The viceroy, considering the difficulties of mounting a defense in the city, rallied his troops and gave orders to leave and do battle outside of Quito. This was the evening of January 18, 1546.

== Forces ==
The Valley of Iñaquito is about 4 km long and it adorns a lagoon on whose shores colorful birds frolic.

At a height that slightly dominates the Valley, Gonzalo Pizarro rallied his troops. He had about 700 men; of these 200 carried muskets and 150 rode horses. His Maestre de Campo, in the absence of Francisco de Carvajal, was Pedro de Puelles. One the leaders of the cavalry was Benito Suárez de Carbajal. They were accompanied by the judge Vásquez de Cepeda. Pizarro gave a fiery speech, whose final phrases were: "Gentlemen, to fight a defend your freedom, life and property."

Viceroy Blasco Núñez Vela's forces made up just over 400 men. His cavalry was almost the same in number as his adversary (some 140 men). Juan Cabrera was his Maestre de Campo, and for the captains of the musketeers and the pikeman: Sancho Sánchez Dávila, Francisco Hernández Girón, Pedro de Heredia y Rodrigo Núñez de Bonilla. The cavalry was divided into two squadrons: the viceroy took command of the major part, and the other he gave command to his captains Sebastián de Benalcázar, Pedro de Bazán y Hernando de Cepeda (Cepeda was the cousin of Santa Teresa de Jesús). Among them, intending to fight as a soldier, was the judge Juan Álvarez.

The Viceroy also delivered a moving speech, promising to be the first to break his spear against the enemy and finished with the dramatic words: "That God is the cause, God is the cause, God is the cause." The viceroy also wore an uncu, an indigenous cotton shirt, that covered his armor and his badges. Some said that this was to avoid enemy fire, and others said that it was to fight with more humility, as one of the soldiers.

== Battle ==
The battle began with musket fire from the viceroy's side, which the rebels immediately responded to. As promised, the viceroy led his riders in an attack against Puelles; and so great was their momentum that the first spear knocked down a rider by the name of Alonso de Montalvo. The clash of both cavalries, almost equal in numbers, was violent. But Pizarro's musketeers came to tip the scales of the fight. When they arrived at one flank, they began to decimate their enemies with deadly accuracy. The combat between the infantries favored Pizarro's side, being superior in number. Benalcázar was wounded by several shots, while Juan de Guevara and Sánchez Dávila were both killed.

With their leaders dead, the viceroy's infantry crumbled. The victorious rebel cavalry destroyed the enemy without compassion, while the musketeers did not cease fire. The viceroy, who valiantly fought in the left flank, was finally reached by a blow from Hernando de Torres (a resident of Arequipa), receiving a mortal wound in the head. At first, they did not identify him due to the indigenous uncu over his armor. However, a little while later he was recognized by a soldier and the news reached Benito Suárez de Carbajal, whose brother Illán had been murdered in Lima by the viceroy. For this reason Carbajal joined the battle, to kill the viceroy with his own hands and avenge the death of his brother. But he was held back by Pedro de Puelles, telling him that it was a rather base thing to go and kill a man who had already fallen. So Benito Suárez sent a black slave to finish the job. The viceroy was beheaded with a single blow, and the head was nailed and raised on a pike for all to see. Not content with this, Benito Suárez had the beard and mustache cut off, and used them to adorn his own hat; others imitated him, such as Juan de la Torre (called "The man from Madrid" to distinguish him from another man by the same name, one of the Famous Thirteen).

The death of the viceroy demoralized the last of his infantry that were still resisting, who were captured and slaughtered. Only a few were able to escape. They were followed for a while by Pizarro's riders, until night fell and Gonzalo sounded the trumpets, gathering his troops and putting an end to the battle.

On the viceroy's side, about 300 died, while the rebels mourned the loss of very few: just seven men. Pizarro was not merciless with his prisoners: Hernández Girón and Benalcázar, wounded in the fight, obtained honorable pardon. Just a few of the most obstinate followers of the viceroy were hanged or exiled to Chile. It was fortunate for the viceroy's men that the cruel Francisco de Carvajal was not there, or else none of them may have escaped death.

The severed head of the viceroy was dragged across the ground to Quito, where it was placed on the pillory. Thanks to influential residents, the body and the head were collected for a decent burial in the cathedral of Quito, later to be transferred to the viceroy's land, Ávila, in Spain. Thus ended the life of the first Viceroy of Peru.
