= Iñaquito =

Parish of Quito, Ecuador

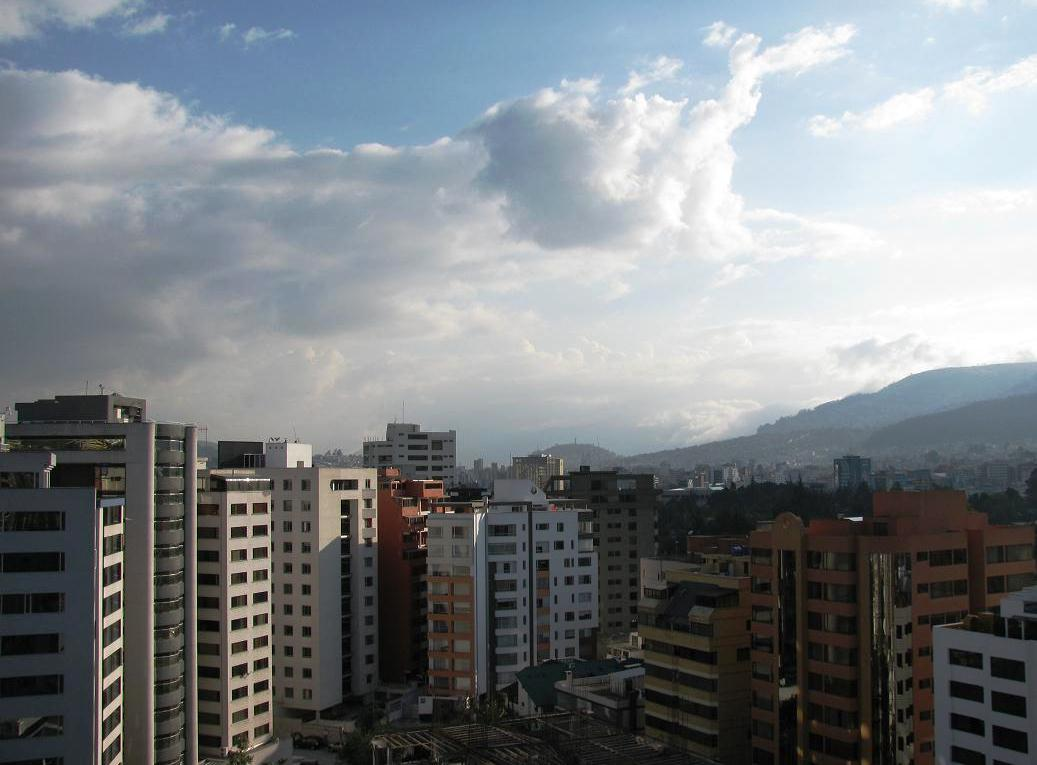
Iñaquito

Iñaquito is a parish of Quito, Ecuador, located toward the north of the city. There is a large concentration of malls in the area, and the population is wealthy relative to the rest of Quito.

This is also home to a large international community in Ecuador, primarily Americans. Various mission agencies have their headquarters for Ecuador here, including HCJB and Youth World. To cater to this international community, the Christian & Missionary Alliance started the Alliance Academy, now called Alliance Academy International, which is currently a school containing around 500 students K-12, the majority being Ecuadorian and American but with students representing around 20 countries. There is also a church in English for this missionary community - English Fellowship church.
