= Rágama =

- Municipality
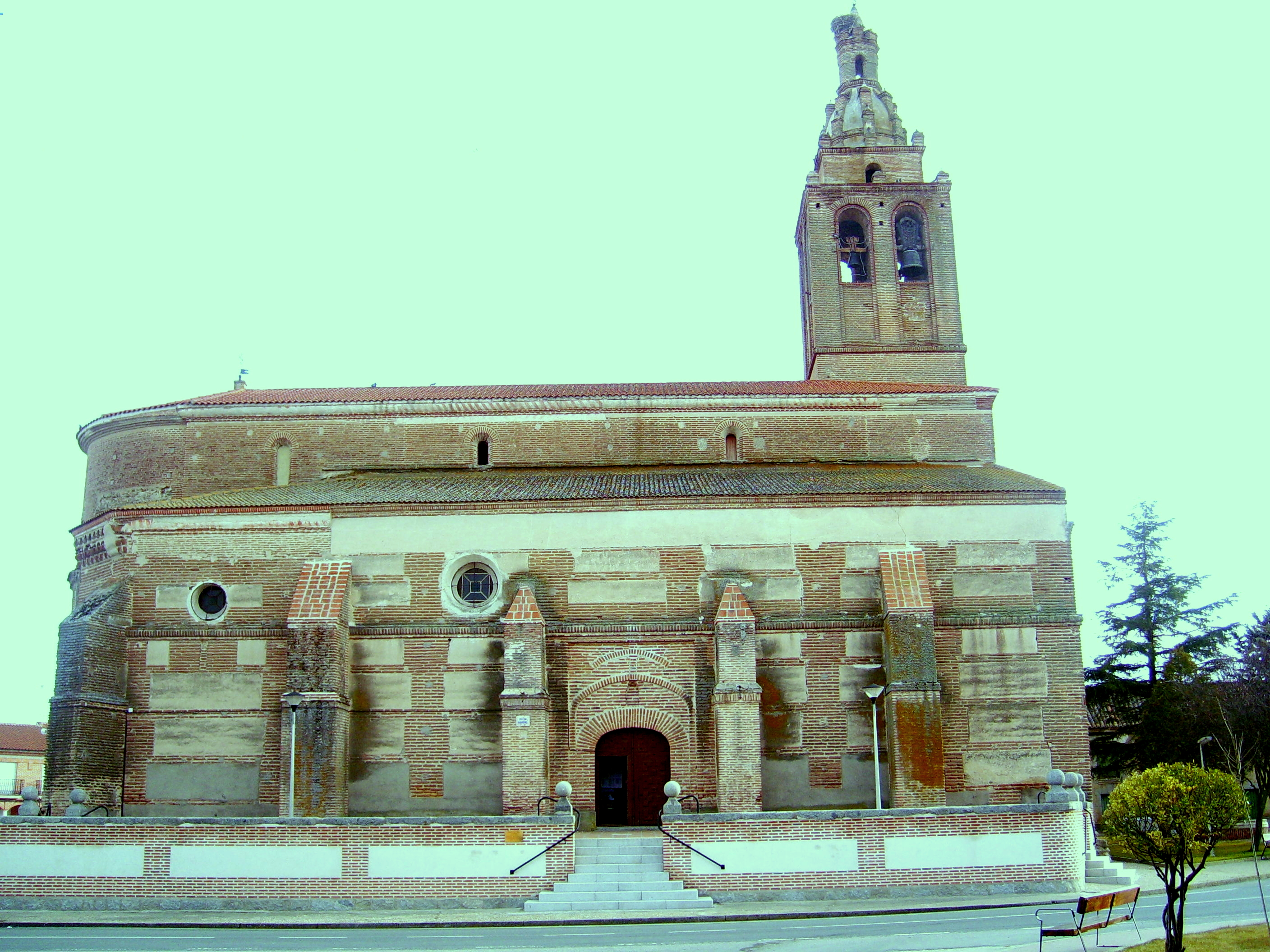

- Coat of arms

- Location in Salamanca
- Coordinates: 40°59′49″N 5°7′40″W
- Country: Spain
- Autonomous community: Castile and León
- Province: Salamanca
- Comarca: Tierra de Peñaranda

Government
  - Mayor: J. Luis Moyano (PSOE)

Area
  - Total: 31.66 km^{2} (12.22 sq mi)
- Elevation: 848 m (2,782 ft)

Population (2025-01-01)
  - Total: 196
  - Density: 6.19/km^{2} (16.0/sq mi)
- Time zone: UTC+1 (CET)
  - Summer (DST): UTC+2 (CEST)
- Postal code: 37318

Rágama is a municipality located in the province of Salamanca, Castile and León, Spain. As of 2016 the municipality has a population of 238 inhabitants.
