= Francisco de Carvajal =

Spanish military officer, conquistador and explorer

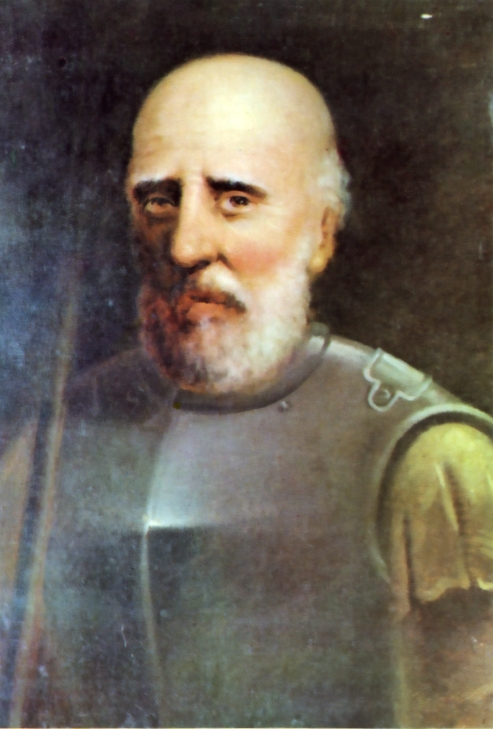
- Portrait of Carvajal at the MNAAHP
- Born: 1464; Rágama, Spain
- Died: 10 April 1548 (aged 83–84); Sacsayhuamán, New Castile
- Military career
- Allegiance: Kingdom of Castile; Monarchy of Spain
- Service years: 1480–1548
- Rank: Maestre de campo
- Nickname: El demonio de los Andes
- Conflicts: War of the League of Cambrai; Battle of Ravenna; Italian War of 1521; Battle of Pavia, War of the League of Cognac; Sack of Rome; Conquest of Peru; Battle of Chupas; Battle of Añaquito; Battle of Huarina; Battle of Jaquijahuana

Francisco de Carvajal (1464 – 10 April 1548) was a Spanish military officer, conquistador, and explorer remembered as "the demon of the Andes" due to his brutality and uncanny military skill in the Peruvian civil wars of the 16th century.

Carvajal's career as a soldier in Europe spanned forty years and a half-dozen wars. Fighting in Spain's Imperial armies—the famous tercios—he served under Charles V's principal commanders in the Italian Wars: Pedro Navarro, Fabrizio Colonna, and the illustrious Gran Capitán, Gonzalo Fernández de Córdoba. He took part in the memorable Spanish victory at the Battle of Pavia in 1525 and acquired a small fortune when the Imperial armies sacked Rome two years later.

In the 1540s, the octogenarian Carvajal travelled to the Spanish West Indies and from there accepted a military commission with the Pizarro brothers in Peru, eventually backing Gonzalo Pizarro's unsuccessful rebellion against the officials of the Spanish Crown. Carvajal proved a tireless soldier and successful strategist. He was ultimately captured in battle by royalist forces on April 9, 1548 and executed at the age of 84.

== Life and military career ==
Born Francisco López Gascón in Rágama de Arévalo, Salamanca, Carvajal was admitted to the University of Salamanca only to return home in disgrace after a series of public scandals. Disinherited, Carvajal enlisted in the Castilian infantry bound for Italy to fight in Charles V's wars. He was present as an alférez when the mutinous Imperial army stormed Rome in 1527. Instead of competing in the violent plunder for gold and valuables, Carvajal seized legal documents belonging to a ranking Roman notary and ransomed them for a small fortune.

Carvajal later used these funds to journey to Mexico as an aide to its first Spanish viceroy, Antonio de Mendoza. In 1535, he was dispatched to Peru to the relief of newly founded Lima, then under siege by an Inca army. Carvajal led reinforcements to Governor Francisco Pizarro and thereafter played a key role in reestablishing Pizarro's rule against the rival faction of conquistadors led by Almagro the Younger.

He continued to lead his cavalry from the front ranks despite his age and obesity and became something of a local legend for his composure in battle. At Chupas, seeing the Imperial Spanish infantry giving way before a hail of fire from Almagro's massed cannons and harquebusiers, Carvajal is said to have ridden to the front of the line and, casting his helmet and cuirass to the ground, exclaimed,

For shame, Spaniards; do you give way now? I am twice as good a mark for the enemy as any of you!"

Inspired by their corpulent commander, Carvajal's men advanced on the enemy guns and carried Almagro's troops before them.

=== Campaign of 1546 ===
As a military man, Carvajal ranks high among the soldiers of the New World. He was strict, even severe, in enforcing discipline, so that he was little loved by his followers [...]; but in the shifts and turns of guerrilla warfare he was unrivalled. Prompt, active, and persevering, he was insensible to danger or fatigue. [...] He knew familiarly every mountain pass, and, such were the sagacity and resources displayed in his roving expeditions, that he was vulgarly believed to be attended by a familiar.

When the royal authority moved against Pizarro in 1546, Carvajal, unable to quit the country due to the embargo on shipping, took command again in the field as Pizarro's lieutenant, or maestre de campo of Nueva Castilla's armies. In the campaign of 1546 Carvajal violently put down the royalist forces in the south of the colony, marching and countermarching from Quito to San Miguel, from Lima to Guamanga and back to Lima, from Lucanas to Cuzco, from Collao to Arequipa and from Arequipa to Charcas.

In the 1540s Francisco de Carvajal's use of firearms in Peru prefigured the volley fire technique that developed in Europe many decades after.

In the Battle of Jaquijahuana (1548) Carvajal met Pedro de Valdivia, who just like him had fought at Pavia, been at the Sack of Rome and helped to defeat Almagro. These two men were the only veterans of the Italian Wars in the battle. Other Spaniards in this battle had only military experience from the Americas.

== Execution ==
Carvajal was sentenced to death by the royalists after being wounded and captured at the Battle of Jaquijahuana. American historian William H. Prescott collected a number of details about the execution, claiming that Carvajal was not gravely troubled by the sentence, remarking simply, "basta matar": "They can only kill me." He refused confession offered by the priests and did not accept his last rites, asking:

But of what use would that be? I have nothing that lies heavy on my conscience, unless it be, indeed, the debt of half a real to a shopkeeper in Seville, which I forgot to pay before leaving the country.

According to Prescott, Carvajal saw guests throughout his last day, but treated his interlocutors to his usual cutting sarcasm. When a former enemy, once vanquished in battle by Carvajal, came to offer his services to the condemned rebel, Carvajal rebuked him caustically:

And what service can you do me? Can you set me free? If you cannot do that, you can do nothing. If I spared your life, as you say, it was probably because I did not think it worthwhile to take it.

Carvajal's only complaint emerged when his executioners arrived to carry him to the place of execution. Upon being bound and forced into a narrow basket, Carvajal exclaimed, "¡Niño en cuna y viejo en cuna!"—"Cradles for infants and now cradles for old men as well!" Carvajal's severed head was exhibited on a pike next to Pizarro's at the gates of Lima.

Carvajal remains a folkloric character in Peru: One legend made him the illegitimate son of the Spanish-Italian tyrant Cesare Borgia. Ricardo Palma pointed out in the Tradiciones peruanas that Carvajal was in fact Borgia's senior by 10 years, their only parentage, he added, being "that of cruelty."
