= New Laws =

Laws to prevent exploitation and mistreatment of indigenous peoples in the Americas

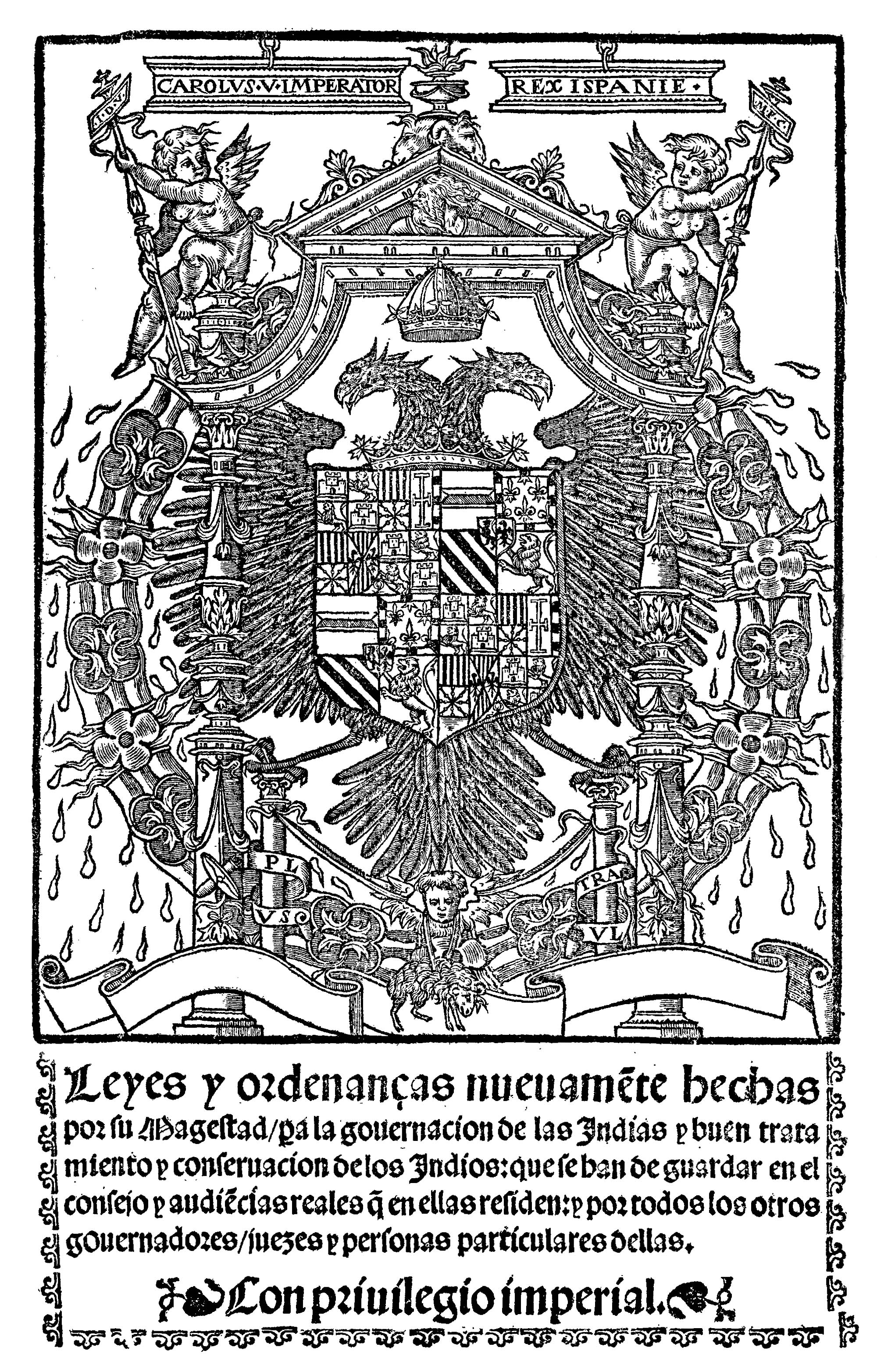
Cover of "Leyes Nuevas" of 1542.

The New Laws (Spanish: Leyes Nuevas), also known as the New Laws of the Indies for the Good Treatment and Preservation of the Indians, were issued on November 20, 1542, by Charles V, Holy Roman Emperor (King Charles I of Spain) and regard the Spanish colonization of the Americas. Following denunciations and calls for reform from individuals, such as the Dominican friar Bartolomé de Las Casas, these laws were intended to prevent the exploitation and mistreatment of the indigenous peoples of the Americas by the encomenderos, by limiting their power and dominion over groups of natives.

Blasco Núñez Vela, the first Viceroy of Peru, enforced the New Laws. He was opposed by a revolt of encomenderos and was killed in 1546 by the landowning faction led by Gonzalo Pizarro. Pizarro wanted to maintain a political structure built upon the Incan model the Spanish found in place. Although the New Laws were only partly successful, due to the opposition of colonists, they did result in the liberation of thousands of indigenous workers, who had been held in a state of semi-slavery.

== Origins ==
The New Laws were the results of a reform movement in reaction to what were considered to be the less effective, decades-old Leyes de Burgos (Laws of Burgos), issued by King Ferdinand II of Aragon on December 27, 1512. These laws were the first intended to regulate relations between the Spanish and the recently conquered indigenous peoples of the New World. These are regarded as the first humanitarian laws in the New World. They were not fully implemented because of opposition by powerful colonists.

While some encomenderos opposed the restrictions imposed by the laws as against their interests, others were opposed because they believed the laws institutionalized the system of forced Indian labor. During the reign of King Charles I, the reformers gained strength. A number of Spanish missionaries argued for stricter rules, including Bartolomé de las Casas and Francisco de Vitoria. Their goal was to protect the Indians against forced labor and expropriation, and to preserve their cultures. Some discussions challenged the very legitimacy of the conquest and colonization.

Eventually, the reformists influenced the King and his court to pass reforms that came to be known as the New Laws.

== Contents ==
=== Main points ===
- Governors had an obligation to take care of the well-being and preserve Native Americans (referred to as Indians by the law).
- That there was no motive to enslave them in the future, not by war, nor due to rebellion, nor to ask for a rescue, nor for any reason or in any way.
- That Native Americans currently enslaved must be freed immediately, unless the owner could prove (in Spain, which implied travelling back there) the full juridical legitimacy of such a state.
- That the "bad habit" of making Native Americans work as tamames against their will or without fair payment must be ended immediately.
- That they must not be taken to remote regions to fish for pearls.
- That only the viceroy had the right to establish encomiendas on Native Americans. The prohibition to establish encomiendas included all religious orders, hospitals, commonalities and civil servants.
- That the "distribution" (of people and lands) given to the original conquerors (as a feudal lordship of sorts) should stop immediately after their death, and both land and the native people would become subject to the Crown.

=== Causes and goals ===
Some of these laws were redundant. Some established protections and rights for Native Americans that native Spaniards did not have themselves. Given the distance from the colonies and the time needed to travel between there and Spain, the Crown was unable to fully monitor compliance with the more ambiguous laws.

The main examples are the cases of slavery and encomiendas. The new laws included the prohibition of enslavement of the Indians and provided for gradual abolition of the encomienda system in America by forbidding it to be inherited by descendants. The New Laws stated that the natives would be considered free persons, and the encomenderos could no longer demand their labour.

The prohibition against enslaving Indians "in any case, not even crime or war", was a right that did not apply to native Castilians themselves. The enslavement of Native Americans had been declared illegal in Castile in 1501, when Isabella I declared Native Americans to be both people and subjects of the Castilian crown, and so subject to the same rights and obligations as any other subject of the queen. Under those regulations, slavery was permitted almost exclusively as a penalty for a serious crime or some exceptional circumstances. Granting extra protection for Native Americans was an attempt by the crown to address its inability to monitor, from Spain, the legitimacy of the claims regarding reasons to enslave a person in the New World, and it acknowledged that false claims could be fabricated to enslave and exploit the native peoples.

The introduction and corruption of the encomienda system is now considered to have been an alternative for outright slavery and a Castilian institution that did not work properly in America. The encomienda was a system that interchanged a person's work for military protection by a higher authority. It had been part of the Castilian legal system since the Reconquista. Given the limited size of the Crown's army, this system allowed nobles or warlords to trade protection for the labor of persons under their purview. It was a way to aid in ensuring the safety of the population of the border areas during the repopulation of the no-man's-land between Castile and the southern Muslim areas. It required either the consent of both parties or the direct intervention of the king, who was responsible for setting reasonable conditions for the parties and to intervene (militarily if required) in case of abuses.

In America, however, colonists used encomiendas to create conditions similar to slavery in areas that did not require such protection. Authorities other than the king claimed the right to assign encomiendas and assigned the most unpleasant or dangerous jobs to the natives.

The New Laws established more specific regulations or stipulated the conditions under the Crown's authority:

- The natives were required only to pay tribute to the encomenderos; if they worked, they were to be paid wages in exchange for their labor.
- The laws prohibited using indigenous people to work in the mines (where many had died) unless it was absolutely necessary, and then under the same working conditions as Spanish mine workers.
- Indians were to be taxed fairly and treated well.
- Public officials or clergy with encomienda grants were ordered to return them immediately to the Crown.
- Encomienda grants would not be passed on via inheritance, but would be cancelled at the death of the individual encomendero.

== Effects ==
The King promulgated the New Laws in 1542. In addition to regulating encomienda and treatment of Indians, they reorganized the overseas colonial administration. Several General Captainships were established, such as the Kingdom of Guatemala, to create another level of Crown authority in the colony.

=== Resistance in Peru ===
When the New Laws were passed, every European man holding an encomienda in Peru learned that his grant of labor could be confiscated if he was guilty of having taken part in the civil disturbances of Francisco Pizarro and Diego de Almagro. As a result, privileged Spanish colonists were disturbed about implementing the New Laws. In Peru, Gonzalo Pizarro led a revolt of protesting encomenderos, who took to arms to "maintain their rights by force" for control of Indian lands and labor.

The Supreme Court of Peru invited Pizarro to take control of the government after his forces reached Lima from Bolivia. Pizarro took over Lima and Quito (now in Ecuador). Viceroy Blasco Núñez Vela, who had attempted to impose the decrees, was overthrown. Pizarro and his army killed Núñez Vela in 1546. Pizarro's power stretched from Peru north to Panama. Charles I and the court became alarmed, and were convinced that the immediate abolition of the encomienda system would bring economic ruin to the colonies. To deal with the revolt, Charles I sent Pedro de la Gasca to the colony; a bishop and diplomat, he did not command an army but was given full powers to rule and negotiate a settlement with Pizarro and his followers. However, Pizarro declared Peru independent from the King. La Gasca provisionally suspended the New Laws. Pizarro was later captured and executed, accused of being a "traitor to the King."

== Level of compliance ==
Although in New Spain (now Mexico), the initial reaction of encomenderos was noncompliance, they did not organize a rebellion as in Peru. New Spain's first viceroy, Antonio de Mendoza, prudently refrained from enforcing the parts of the New Laws most objectionable to the encomenderos. Over time, the encomenderos complied with most aspects of the laws. Most already maintained a horse and arms in case of Indian rebellion, and had established a residence in a Spanish settlement. They hired priests to minister to the Indians whose labor was granted to them. While they were not allowed to retain their encomiendas in perpetuity, they were permitted to bequeath the properties and labor once. They allowed Indians to fulfill obligations by payment of tribute, often in produce. The dramatic declines in Indian population due to epidemic disease, however, resulted in economic losses for the encomenderos.

In the Province of Paraguay, non-compliance with the New Laws was systematic and extensively documented. The cleric Martín González reported to the cabildo of Asunción in 1558 that 16 years after their promulgation they had still not been published or applied in the province. The primary violation concerned the trafficking of indigenous women: despite the laws' prohibition of indigenous enslavement, Guaraní women were bought, sold, and exported to the Portuguese port of São Vicente as slaves, with royal officials collecting taxes on those transactions as if they were sales of African slaves. In a letter of 3 March 1545, the priest Francisco González de Paniagua denounced that colonists were selling free Guaraní women as if they were slaves from Guinea, in transactions disguised as exchanges of houses, fields, or cloaks. In a January 1559 letter, González estimated that violence against indigenous people was so widespread that "if I had to name all the people who mistreat them in various ways I could name more than half of the Spaniards in the land." For further context, see Indigenous women in the conquest of Paraguay.

== Legacy ==
In 1545, the Crown revoked the inheritance restriction of the New Laws. By strengthening the power of the encomenderos, the encomienda system was made secure. While the New Laws were partly successful, they did result in the liberation of thousands of Indigenous workers from enforced servitude.

Most of the ordinances of the New Laws were later incorporated into the general corpus of the Laws of the Indies. In some cases they were superseded by newer laws. A weaker version of the New Laws was issued in 1552.

== See also ==
- Laws of the Indies
- Philip II of Spain
- 1599 Philippines Referendum
- Spanish Empire

== Sources ==
- Kenneth J. Andrien, Andean Worlds, 2001
- Joseph Pérez. Historia de España ISBN 84-8432-091-X
- Crow, John A. (1992). The Epic of Latin America. University of California Press. ISBN 978-0-520-07723-2.
- "Laws of the Indies". Encyclopædia Britannica Online.
- Leyes y ordenanças nueuame[n]te hechas por su Magestad pa la gouernacion de las Indias y buen tratamiento y conseruacion de los Indios ... : que se han de guardar en el consejo y audie[n]cias reales q[ue] en ellas residen y por todos los otros gouernadores juezes y personas particulares dellas. Original text from the Biblioteca Nacional de España (National Library of Spain).
- "Pizarro, Gonzalo." Encyclopædia Britannica. 2008. Encyclopædia Britannica Online. 6 Nov. 2008 <http://search.eb.com/eb/article-9060257>.
- "New Laws" <https://web.archive.org/web/20100820022800/http://www.isitlegalto.com/new-laws/>.
