= Gonzalo Pizarro =

Spanish conquistador (1510–1548)

Gonzalo Pizarro y Alonso
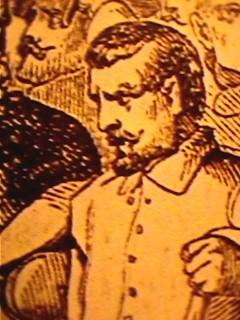
- Born: 1510; Trujillo, Spain
- Died: 10 April 1548 (aged 37–38); Cusco, Peru
- Cause of death: Decapitation
- Occupation: Conquistador
- Known for: Raping the Incan queen Cura Ocllo
- Relatives: Juan Pizarro (brother); Francisco Pizarro (half brother); Hernándo Pizarro (half brother)
- Military career
- Allegiance: Spanish Empire
- Service years: 1530–1548
- Conflicts: Conflicts: Spanish Conquest of the Inca Empire; Siege of Cusco; Battle of Ollantaytambo; Battle of Las Salinas; Battle of Iñaquito; Battle of Huarina; Battle of Jaquijahuana (POW)

Gonzalo Pizarro y Alonso ([gonˈθalo piˈθaro]; 1510 – 10 April 1548) was a Spanish conquistador. He was the younger paternal half brother of Francisco Pizarro, who led the Spanish conquest of the Inca Empire. Pizarro was the illegitimate son of Gonzalo Pizarro y Rodríguez de Aguilar (1446–1522), who, as an infantry colonel, served under Gonzalo Fernández de Córdoba during the Italian Wars. He was also the younger paternal half brother of Hernándo Pizarro y de Vargas and the older full brother of Juan Pizarro y Alonso.

== Military career ==
=== Conquest of the Inca Empire ===
Born in Trujillo, Spain, Gonzalo Pizarro accompanied his eldest brother, Francisco Pizarro, in his third expedition for the conquest of Peru in 1530. Gonzalo was also the brother of Hernando Pizarro and Juan Pizarro. A lieutenant of his brother Francisco during the conquest, Gonzalo Pizarro was one of the most corrupt, brutal and ruthless conquistadors of the New World, being far less restrained towards the natives and the Inca than his older brothers.

After Inca emperor Atahualpa was captured in the Battle of Cajamarca and later executed, the Pizarro brothers and their followers marched towards the Inca capital of Cuzco to complete the conquest, capturing the city on 15 November 1533 after a brief battle with the Inca forces under Quizquiz holding it after previously defeating the central government and massacring the nobility of Cuzco. Gonzalo, and his brother Juan, were made regidores of the city on 24 March 1534.

Cuzco was split into factions behind Francisco Pizarro and Diego de Almagro, but these two signed a new article of agreement on 12 June 1535. Almagro then left Cuzco, having been given the honour by Spanish King Charles I of exploring the southern part of Peru (modern-day Chile)

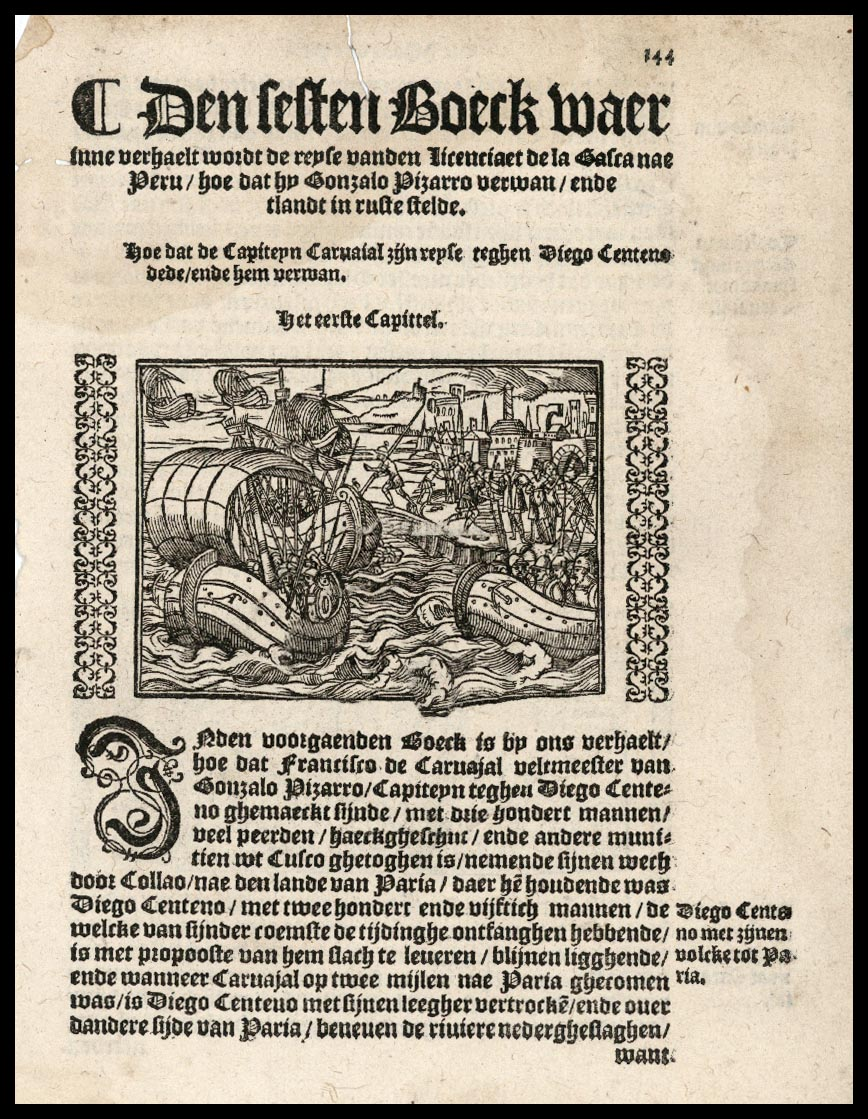
Gonzalo Pizarro sailing in Perú. Year of work:1554

Gonzalo and Juan Pizarro both looked after the settlements in Cuzco, while their eldest brother Francisco explored the west coast of northern Peru and founded the city of Lima in 1535. Gonzalo, Juan and his younger brother Hernándo ruled Cuzco as a dictatorship dominated by greed, corruption and brutality; torturing and executing those who refused to accept Spanish rule. Particularly egregious was the conduct of Juan and Gonzalo Pizarro towards the Inca monarch, Manco Inca Yupanqui. Manco was angered by the conduct of the Spaniards towards Incan women, especially after Gonzalo raped his queen and sister-wife Cura Ocllo. According to Fernández de Oviedo, Hernando Pizarro, Juan Pizarro and Gonzalo Pizarro "left no one single woman or sister of his [Manco's] unviolated", and had taken the Inca princesses as concubines. The Spaniards' corrupt rule and disrespectful treatment towards Manco Inca Yupanqui led to large-scale rebellion.

The Incas fought the Spaniards in a number of sieges and battles for control of the land and temporarily captured Cuzco on May 6, 1536. The Incas were later defeated by the heavily armed Spanish soldiers led by Gonzalo and Juan. Smallpox also spread among the natives and many perished.

When Almagro returned from Chile disappointed in not finding any gold, he captured and imprisoned Gonzalo and Hernándo on 8 April 1537. Gonzalo managed to escape and rejoin Francisco Pizarro, while Almagro was on his way to Lima to negotiate with Francisco on who would control Cuzco. These negotiations led to Hernándo's release. Hernando and Gonzalo then led an army against Almagro, defeating him in the Battle of Las Salinas. Almagro was captured, condemned for treason, and executed in Cusco on July 8, 1538.

==== Expeditions with Francisco de Orellana ====
In November 1539, Francisco Pizarro appointed Gonzalo vice-governor of Quito, which had been taken in 1534 by Sebastián de Benalcázar. Gonzalo was ordered to explore east of Quito to investigate the rumours of a rich native kingdom to the east, called El Dorado, and of the so-called Land of Cinnamon - "País de la Canela". Gonzalo set about organising an expedition in Cuzco; among those he recruited was Francisco de Orellana, a veteran of the conquest of the Inca and a dependable supporter of the Pizarro brothers. With 170 Spaniards and 3,000 Native Americans, Gonzalo marched to Quito in December 1540 and enlisted more people, to reach a total of 220 Spaniards and 4,000 Native Americans. Orellana, Gonzalo's second-in-command and relative, was sent to Guayaquil to gather more troops and horses. Gonzalo Pizarro and his followers left Quito on February 1541, a month before Orellana, who was able to bring 23 men besides him, and several horses. By March, the two groups met at the valley of Zumaco and started their march across the Andes. After following the courses of the Coca and Napo rivers, the expedition started to run out of provisions. About 140 of the 244 Spaniards and 3,000 out of 4,000 natives died. In February 1542, the leaders decided Orellana would take 50 men and continue sailing down the Napo river in search of food, then return to Pizarro. However, the return trip proved impossible because of adverse currents and Orellana's own pursuit of discovery.

After a brief period, Gonzalo concluded the expedition was a complete failure and decided to take a northern route back to Quito with 80 of the remaining men, unknowingly relinquishing the success to Orellana, who ended up discovering and exploring the entire length of the Amazon River.

Upon his return to Quito, Gonzalo learnt that the Almagristas (as the followers of Almagro were called) had assassinated his brother Francisco Pizarro on June 26, 1541 in retaliation for Almagro's execution. By this time the Crown's representative, Cristóbal Vaca de Castro, had arrived in Peru amidst the confusion after Pizarro's death. Gonzalo offered to help capture those responsible for his brother's death, but was refused. The Almagristas were finally defeated in the battle of Chupas on September 16, 1542, and their leader, Diego Almagro El Mozo, was executed.

=== Mutiny against the New Laws ===
Emperor Charles V then appointed Blasco Núñez Vela as Peru's first viceroy in 1544. Núñez introduced the New Laws, which were framed by Bartolomé de las Casas to protect the indigenous peoples. Many of the conquistadors living in Peru were against these laws since they could no longer exploit the natives. This prompted Gonzalo Pizarro and Francisco de Carvajal to organise an army of followers with the intent of suppressing the New Laws, in what became known as the Gran Rebelión de Encomenderos, or Great Encomendero Rebellion. Many conquistadors turned against the Viceroy and joined Gonzalo's side, as his surname provided an effective rallying point. The rebel army defeated Núñez in 1546 at Añaquito near Quito. Although some, such as Carvajal, advised Gonzalo to proclaim himself King of Peru and to disown any further claim by the King of Spain to the land, Gonzalo refused.

==== Execution by the Spanish army ====
Over the following months, however, the support for Gonzalo diminished when the King's new representative, Pedro de la Gasca, arrived with the intention of offering pardon and repealing the New Laws. Most of Gonzalo's army deserted him just before the crucial battle of Jaquijahuana near Cuzco, that would determine the fate of the conquest. No longer supported by an army against the King's new representative, Gonzalo Pizarro surrendered and was beheaded by the royal forces on the field of battle, being the last of the Pizarro brothers to die a violent death (with Hernando dying of old age in Spain some three decades later).

== In popular culture ==
Gonzalo Pizarro has been depicted in several different projects over the years. In 1972, Werner Herzog wrote and directed the film Aguirre, the Wrath of God, starring Klaus Kinski and featuring Alejandro Repullés as Gonzalo. The film reimagines two expeditions led by Gonzalo Pizarro, one in 1541, which resulted in the European discovery of the Amazon river by Francisco de Orellana, and another in which Pizarro and his men went in search of El Dorado. Aguirre, the Wrath of God received widespread critical acclaim and has appeared on Time magazine's list of "All Time 100 Best Films".

== Family tree ==
Ancestors of Gonzalo Pizarro y Alonso

8. Fernando or Hernándo Alonso de Hinojosa
4. Fernando Alonso Pizarro
9. Teresa Martínez Pizarro
2. Gonzalo Pizarro y Rodríguez de Aguilar
10.
5. Isabel de Vargas y Rodríguez de Aguilar
11.
1. Gonzalo Pizarro y Alonso
12.
6.
13.
3. María Alonso
14.
7.
15.
