= Pedro de la Gasca =

Spanish bishop and diplomat

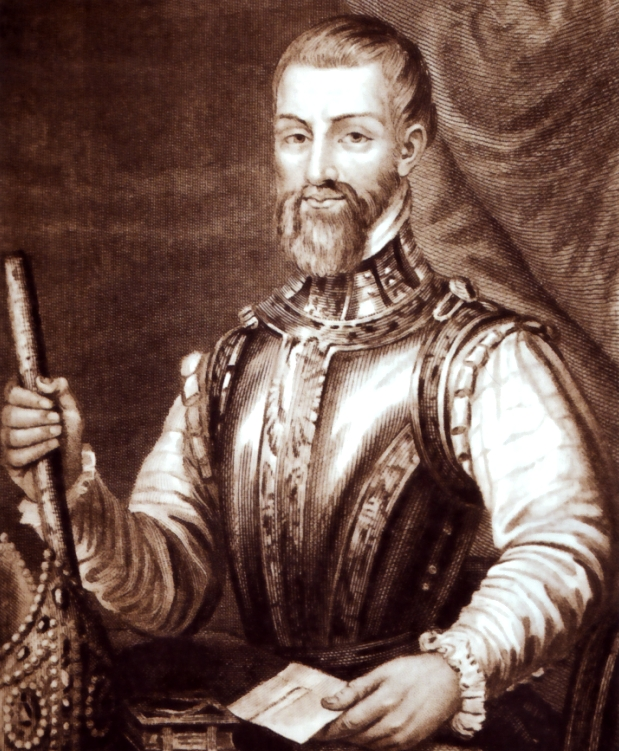

Interim Viceroy of Peru
- In office 23 September 1551 – 21 July 1552
- Monarch: Charles V
- Preceded by: Blasco Núñez Vela
- Succeeded by: Antonio de Mendoza

Personal details
- Born: June 1485 Navarregadilla, Ávila Province, Spain
- Died: 13 November 1567 (aged 82) Sigüenza, Spain
- Occupation: Diplomat, bishop

Pedro de la Gasca (June 1485 – 13 November 1567) was a Spanish bishop, diplomat and the second (acting) viceroy of Peru, from 10 April 1547 to 27 January 1550.

He was known for his renowned political ability in spite of his physical deformity. Francis Bacon placed Gasca among the similarly physically challenged Socrates, Agesilaus II and Şehzade Cihangir, and speculated his outstanding character and achievements may have been driven by a need to overcome the poor impression made by his physical shortcomings.

== Biography ==
Pedro de la Gasca studied at the University of Salamanca and the University of Alcalá. He became a priest and a lawyer, and was known for his intellect and his strange body proportions. According to William H. Prescott, drawing from Inca Garcilaso de la Vega, Gasca's "countenance was far from comely" and he "was awkward and ill proportioned; for his limbs were too long for his body, — so that when he rode he appeared to be much shorter than he really was." In 1542 he was negotiator for Emperor Charles V in discussions with the pope and King Henry VIII, a position requiring great diplomatic skill.

Gonzalo Pizarro, brother of Francisco Pizarro, the conqueror of Peru, rose in revolt due to the implementation of the New Laws which offered the natives protection from exploitation by the conquistadors, killed viceroy Blasco Núñez Vela in battle in 1546, took control of the Viceroyalty of Peru, and attempted to have himself crowned king. The Emperor, recovering from a ruinous war, was unable to send an army against Pizarro. Instead, he commissioned La Gasca to restore the peace, naming him president of the Audiencia and providing him with unlimited authority to punish and pardon the rebels.

La Gasca sailed from Spain in May 1546, without troops or money. Two Dominican priests and a few servants made up his party.

He arrived in Panama, representing himself as a peacemaker charged only with reestablishing justice and granting a general amnesty. La Gasca suggested that if he were unable to fulfill his offices, a royal fleet of 40 ships and 15,000 men was preparing to sail from Seville in June to restore the peace in Peru by more forceful methods. Pizarro's fleet was stationed in Panama, and La Gasca's diplomatic skills soon converted Pizarro's officers to La Gasca's cause.

Gonzalo Pizarro, however, refused to submit, and fled secretly to Cuzco, where he had loyal troops. La Gasca, escorted by nearly the whole fleet of Pizarro, landed at Tumbes in 1547. He issued a proclamation announcing his mission as peacekeeper and inviting all good citizens to join him in restoring tranquility. In another proclamation he granted amnesty to all deserters and promised rewards to those who would take up arms in defense of the Crown. He also repealed the New Laws, the cause around which the rebellion had been organized.

La Gasca soon assembled a respectable army. He took command himself and marched to Cuzco in December 1547. Pizarro arrived on the plain of Jaquijahuana (Sacsahuana) near Cuzco with a strong force, but La Gasca, relying more on his diplomatic than on his military skills, entered negotiations with Pizarro's officers, winning them over by promises and threats. The two armies met on 9 April 1548 in the battle of Jaquijahuana. Most of Pizarro's officers and men went over to La Gasca, with the exception of Francisco de Carvajal, dubbed the Demon of the Andes. The royalist forces were masters of the field, without having struck a blow.

La Gasca had Pizarro and some of his important followers, including de Carvajal executed. He dispersed the adventurers, rewarded the royalists, and pardoned the majority of the rebels. He reorganized the administration of justice and the collection of taxes, and he issued several regulations opposed to the oppression of the Indigenous.

La Gasca was tactful and judicious, but unyielding in his devotion to duty. Prescott wrote that the secret of Gasca's effectiveness was his unquestioned honesty:

In accomplishing his objects, he disclaimed force equally with fraud. He trusted for success to his power over the convictions of his hearers; and the source of this power was the confidence he inspired in his own integrity. Amidst all the calumnies of faction, no imputation was ever cast on the integrity of Gasca.

In 1549 he surrendered his powers to the Audiencia. On 27 January 1550 he left Peru to return to Spain. On his arrival there he was made bishop of Palencia by Charles V. In 1561 Philip II promoted him to the see of Sigüenza.

== Works ==
- «Relación de las provincias que hay en la conquista de Chuquimaio por Pedro de La Gasca. Perú». 1549.

Government offices
Preceded by Blasco Núñez Vela	Viceroy of Peru; 1546–1549	Succeeded by Antonio de Mendoza
