= Blasco Núñez Vela =

First viceroy of Peru

The Most Excellent Blasco Núñez Vela KOS
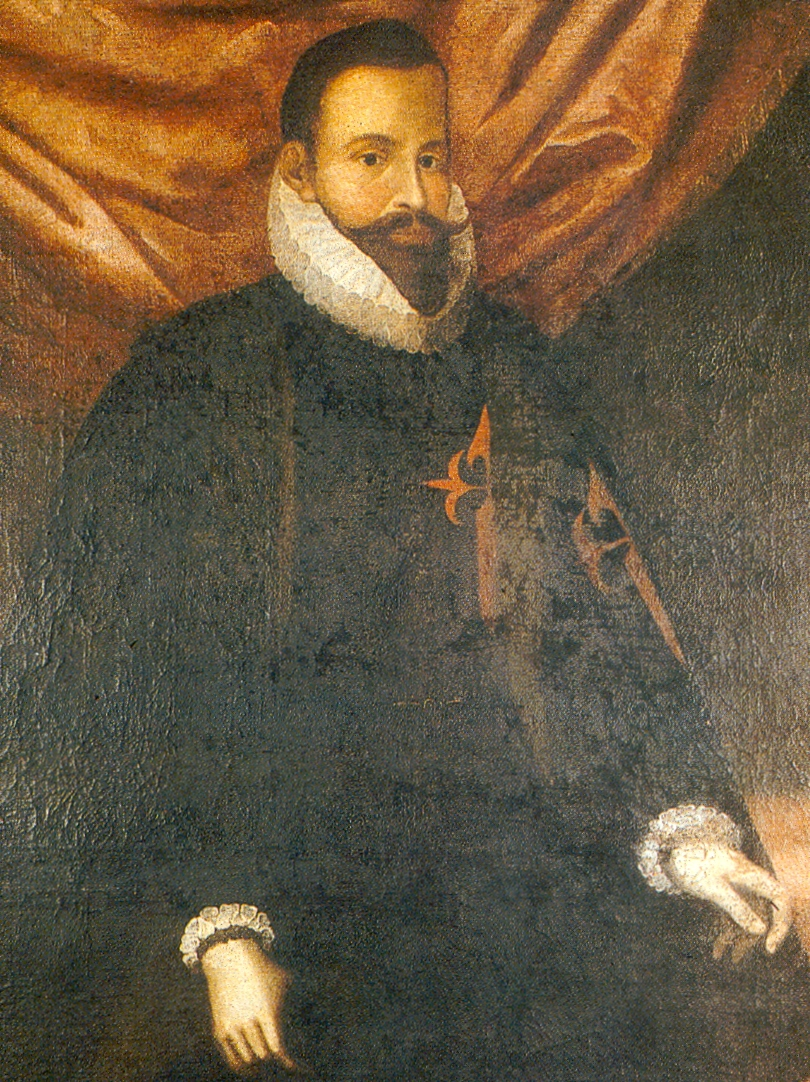

1st Viceroy of Peru
- In office May 15, 1544 – January 18, 1546
- Monarch: Charles V
- Preceded by: Position established
- Succeeded by: Pedro de la Gasca

Personal details
- Born: c. 1490 Ávila, Crown of Castille
- Died: January 18, 1546 (aged 55–56) Añaquito, near present day Quito, Viceroyalty of Peru

Blasco Núñez Vela (c. 1490 – January 18, 1546) was the first Spanish viceroy of South America ("Viceroyalty of Peru"). Serving from May 15, 1544 to January 18, 1546, he was charged by Charles V with the enforcement of the controversial New Laws, which dealt with the failure of the encomienda system to protect the indigenous people of America from the rapacity of the conquistadors and their descendants.

== Origins ==
Núñez Vela was a native of Ávila, born into an ancient and noble family. The Núñez Vela family, lords of Tabadillo, lived in this area from at least 1403. He was a descendant of Don Pedro Nuñez de la Fuente Almexir (Fuentearmegil) the loyal, who saved the life of the King of Castile, Alfonso VIII in 1163. He was a knight of the Order of Santiago and corregidor of Málaga and Cuenca, Spain, and devoted to the service of the king. One of his brothers was lord of the bedchamber to the king, and another was archbishop of Burgos. Although honest, loyal and courageous, Núñez was also very hot headed.

== Appointment as viceroy ==
In 1543 he was named viceroy, governor and captain general of Peru and president of the Audiencia, and also captain general of Chile, with a salary of 5,000 ducats.

He sailed from Sanlucar on November 3, 1543 in command of a fleet, with much pomp, and arrived in Lima on May 17, 1544. He was accompanied by the members of the Audiencia and other illustrious personalities. His last instructions from the king were to "show himself to be a severe punisher of infractions." Núñez's adherence to these instructions was to prove very costly.

== The New Laws ==
The New Laws promulgated by Charles, under the influence of reformers such as Bartolomé de las Casas, had been established to improve the lot of the indigenous peoples of the Americas within the Spanish dominions. They were intended to clarify, expand and enforce provisions of the Laws of Burgos of 1512. The latter had provided many safeguards for the indigenous population, but these had not been strictly enforced. The New Laws became effective November 20, 1542.

In order to enforce the New Laws and suppress the insubordination of the conquistadors in New Spain and Peru, representatives of the Crown were provided with the powers and authority of the king. The new office was designated a viceroyalty at the head of which was a viceroy or virrey. Audiencias were also appointed to assist the viceroys in the administration of civil and criminal justice. The Audiencias were composed of four oidores (judges).

== Actions as viceroy ==
Núñez arrived at Nombre de Dios on January 10, 1544, and passed from there to Panama City. Leaving the Audiencia in Panama, he sailed for Peru, arriving at Tumbes on March 14, 1544. He went from there to Trujillo, where he was solemnly received, and thence to La Barranca. In La Barranca he may have read on one of the walls, "Whoever comes to take my hacienda, his life will be taken".

The New Laws were not well received by the conquistadors because they provided that what was effectively Indian slavery had to end, that everyone had to pay a fair share of taxes, and that all the encomienda rights had to go to the king. The conquistadors would have none of this.

Núñez arrived in Lima, the capital of the colony, on May 17, 1544, where he was received in royal splendor and sworn into office. News of governmental measures he had already taken on the voyage had preceded him, and he was met with hostility and resistance from the officials and clergy. Núñez himself now had doubts about enforcing the New Laws in the current situation. He agreed to join the Spanish landowners in the colony in a petition to the emperor to suspend them, but claiming a lack of authority, he refused to suspend them on his own initiative.

The resistance aggravated his distrust and increased the severity of his measures. He imprisoned Cristóbal Vaca de Castro, his predecessor as head of the colonial government, and then had him sent to Spain. On September 13, 1544, in a late night interview in the viceroy's palace, Núñez accused Juan Suárez de Carbajal of treason. The exchange became heated, and Núñez killed Suárez with a dagger.

== Deposition as viceroy ==
The death of Suárez led the Audiencia to break with the viceroy. Believing they could rely on help from Gonzalo Pizarro, brother of Francisco Pizarro, they determined to remove Núñez from office and send him back to Spain. (Pizarro had already raised a small army in opposition to the viceroy.) On September 18, 1544 they deposed him and ordered his imprisonment. The viceroy was sent a prisoner to the island of San Lorenzo, to be handed over to oidor Álvarez. In Álvarez's custody, Núñez left San Lorenzo for Panama on September 24. Just out of port, Álvarez told the viceroy he was now free, and turned over command of the ship to him.

== The civil war ==
Núñez ordered the ship to sail for Tumbes, where he disembarked in the middle of October. He gathered an army and led it south to battle the conquistadors. Pizarro made his solemn entry into Lima on October 28, at the head of 1,200 well-trained and well-armed soldiers, with artillery, under the royal banner of Castile. Both sides claimed to be defenders of the king. Pizarro was sworn in before the Audiencia as interim governor and captain general of Peru, until a replacement could be named by the king.

Núñez and his small force left San Miguel (near Quito) just ahead of Pizarro's soldiers. The hope was to link up in the high country with Benalcazar, the loyal commander at Popayan. Indecisive skirmishes were fought along the line of march. Núñez, suspecting treachery among his officers, had three of them executed. Núñez arrived in Popayan, and Pizarro occupied Quito, formerly friendly territory for the viceroy. Pizarro lured Núñez out of Popayan to Quito by a stratagem. The two armies met January 18, 1546 at nearby Añaquito.

Seven hundred soldiers of the army of Pizarro fought Núñez and his smaller army of a few hundred at Añaquito. Núñez fought bravely, in spite of his age, but he was killed in the battle and then decapitated. His head was marched about on a pike to demonstrate that the conquistadors had won and were now in charge. Fearing the loss of the American colonies the Crown watered down the New Laws and restored the encomiendas.

King Charles recognized the fallen viceroy and his sons, ordering that Núñez be honored annually. Charles made two of his sons knights, one in the Order of Santiago and one in the Order of Alcántara. The sons became ambassador to France, captain general of artillery, and archbishop of Burgos.

== See also ==
- History of Peru
- Spanish conquest of Peru
- Valladolid debate

== Sources ==
- (in Spanish) Brief biography
- Prescott, William H (1843). History of the Conquest of Peru. New York, NY: The Modern Library. Archived from the original on 2015-12-23.
- Akers, Charles Edmond; Edmundson, George (1911). "Peru" . In Chisholm, Hugh (ed.). Encyclopædia Britannica. Vol. 21 (11th ed.). Cambridge University Press. p. 275.

Government offices
Preceded by Cristóbal Vaca de Castro	Viceroy of Peru; 1544–1546	Succeeded by Pedro de la Gasca
