= Cetina (disambiguation) =

The Cetina is a river in southern Croatia.

Cetina may also refer to:

- Cetina, Croatia, village in Civljane municipality, Šibenik-Knin County, Croatia
- Cetina, Aragon, municipality in Zaragoza Province, Spain
- Beltrán de Cetina (1525-1600?), Spanish conquistador
- Gutierre de Cetina (1519-1554), Spanish poet and soldier
