= List of conquistadors =

The following is a list of conquistadors.

== A ==
- Lope de Aguirre
- Hernando de Alarcón
- Jeronimo de Alderete
- Pedro Munoz de Alderete
- Diego de Almagro
- Hernando Alonso
- Alonso de Alvarado
- Hernando de Alvarado
- Pedro de Alvarado
- Luis de Moscoso Alvarado
- Juan de Ampudia
- Pascual de Andagoya
- Pedro Arias de Ávila
- Lucas Vázquez de Ayllón
- Juan de Ayolas

== B ==
- Vasco Núñez de Balboa
- Rodrigo de Bastidas
- Sebastián de Belalcázar
- Antonio de Berrío
- Francisco de Bobadilla

== C ==
- Álvar Núñez Cabeza de Vaca
- Sebastian Cabot
- Juan Rodríguez Cabrillo
- Alonso de Cáceres
- Bartolomé Camacho Zambrano
- Juan de la Cámara
- Pedro de Candia
- Francisco Cano
- Alberto del Canto
- Alonso Capote
- Alonso de Cárdenas
- García López de Cárdenas
- Antonio Díaz de Cardoso
- Juan de Carvajal
- Luis de Carvajal y de la Cueva
- Francisco César
- Juan de Céspedes
- Beltrán de Cetina
- Gregorio de Cetina
- Pedro Cieza de León
- Christopher Columbus
- Francisco Hernández de Córdoba (founder of Nicaragua)
- Francisco Hernández de Córdoba (Yucatán conquistador)
- Francisco Vázquez de Coronado
- Hernán Cortés
- Juan de la Cosa
- Bartolomé de Las Casas

== D ==
- Alonso Díaz Moreno
- Bernal Díaz del Castillo
- Melchor Díaz
- Miguel Díez de Aux

== E ==
- Ambrosius Ehinger

== F ==
- Francisco Fajardo
- Nikolaus Federmann
- Martín Fernández de Enciso
- Pedro Fernández de Lugo
- Pedro Fernández de Valenzuela
- Juan Freyle
- Alejandro de la Fuente

== G ==
- Aleixo Garcia
- Diego García de Paredes
- Juan García Pizarro
- Martín de Goiti
- Estêvão Gomes
- Gil González Dávila
- Garci González de Silva
- Juan de Grijalva
- Nuño de Guzmán

== H ==
- Pedro de Heredia
- Miguel Holguín y Figueroa
- Philipp von Hutten

== I ==
- Domingo Martínez de Irala

== L ==
- Luis Lanchero
- Miguel López de Legazpi
- Diego de Losada

== M ==
- Gonzalo Macías
- Manuel de Mederos
- Baltasar Maldonado
- Juan Maldonado
- Pedro Malaver de Silva
- Luis Marin
- Diego de Mazariegos
- Pedro de Mendoza
- Pedro Menéndez de Avilés
- Pedro Menéndez de Márquez
- Gutierre de Miranda
- Diego Miruelo
- Francisco de Montejo
- Diego de Montemayor

== N ==
- Pánfilo de Narváez
- Diego de Nicuesa

== O ==
- Alonso de Ojeda
- Cristóbal de Olid
- Diego de Ordaz
- Francisco de Orellana
- Juan de Oñate
- Rodrigo Orgóñez
- Joan Orpí i del Pou

== P ==
- Alonso Álvarez de Pineda
- Vicente Yáñez Pinzón
- Francisco Pizarro
- Gonzalo Pizarro
- Juan Pizarro
- Hernándo Pizarro
- Juan Ponce de León

== Q ==
- Gonzalo Jiménez de Quesada
- Hernán Pérez de Quesada

== R ==
- Jorge Robledo
- Juan Rodríguez Suárez
- Gaspar de Rodas
- Diego de Roxas
- Bartolomé Ruiz

== S ==
- Juan de Salcedo
- Juan de Sanct Martín
- Francisco "Chamuscado" Sánchez
- Gonzalo de Sandoval
- Ulrico Schmidl
- Hernando de Soto
- Juan Díaz de Solís
- Georg von Speyer
- Gonzalo Suárez Rendón

== T ==
- Pedro de Tovar

== U ==
- Francisco de Ulloa
- Martín de Ursúa
- Pedro de Ursúa

== V ==
- Pedro de Valdivia
- Juan Valiente
- Diego Velázquez de Cuéllar
- Ortún Velázquez de Velasco
- Hernán Venegas Carrillo
- Juan de Villegas

== See also ==
- Conquistador
- List of explorers
- Spanish colonization of the Americas
- List of conquistadors in Colombia
- Encomienda
