= Mederos =

Mederos is a Spanish surname. Notable people with the surname include:

- Manuel de Mederos (1539–1613), Portuguese explorer
- Rene Mederos (1933–1996), Cuban artist
- Rodolfo Mederos (born 1940), Argentine musician
- Rogel Lazaro Aguilera-Mederos, a truck driver responsible for the 2019 Lakewood semi-truck crash
- Víctor Mederos (born 2001), Cuban baseball player

== See also ==
- Medeiros (disambiguation), the Portuguese-language variant
- Medero
