= Medero =

Medero is a surname. Notable people with the surname include:

- Benito Medero (1922–2007), Uruguayan politician
- Gabriela Medero (born 1976), Brazilian-Scottish civil engineer
- Luis Medero (born 1973), Argentine footballer

== See also ==
- Mederos
- Mederow
