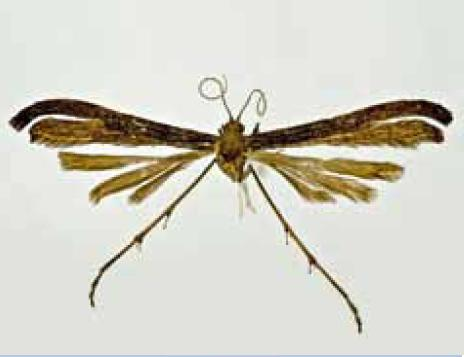

Scientific classification
- Kingdom: Animalia
- Phylum: Arthropoda
- Class: Insecta
- Order: Lepidoptera
- Family: Pterophoridae
- Genus: Hellinsia
- Species: H. benalcazari

Binomial name
- Hellinsia benalcazari Gielis, 2011

= Hellinsia benalcazari =

Species of plume moth

Hellinsia benalcazari is a moth of the family Pterophoridae. It is found in Ecuador.

Adults are on wing in April, at an altitude of 1,560 m (5,120 ft).

== Etymology ==
The species is named after Sebastian de Benalcazar, lieutenant of Francisco Pizarro, the conquistador of South America.
