= Mederow =

Mederow is a German surname. Notable people with the surname include:

- Heinrich Mederow (born 1945), German rower
- Paul Mederow (1887–1974), German stage and film actor

== See also ==
- Medero
- Mederos
