= Torrijo =

Torrijo can refer to:

The name of several places in Spain:

- Torrijo del Campo, a town in the province of Teruel, Aragon
- Torrijo de la Cañada, a town in the province of Zaragoza, Aragon
