= Juan de la Cosa =

Spanish navigator

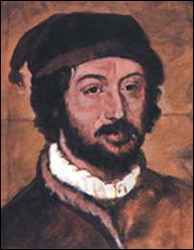
- Born: Assumed to be between 1450 and 1460; Santoña, Crown of Castile
- Died: 28 February 1510; Turbaco, Spanish Main, Spanish Empire
- Other name: Juan the Biscayne
- Occupations: Navigator and cartographer
- Notable work: Map of Juan de la Cosa

Juan de la Cosa (c. 1450 – 28 February 1510) was a Castilean navigator and cartographer, known for designing the earliest European world map which incorporated the territories of the Americas discovered in the 15th century.

De la Cosa was the owner and master of the Santa María, and thus played an important role in the first and second voyage of Christopher Columbus to the West Indies.

In 1499, he served as the chief pilot in the expedition of Alonso de Ojeda to the coasts of South America. Upon his return to Andalusia, he drew his famous mappa mundi ("world map") and soon returned to the Indies, this time with Rodrigo de Bastidas. In the following years, De la Cosa alternated trips to America under his own command with special duties from the Crown, including an assignment as a spy in Lisbon and participation in the board of pilots held in Burgos in 1508. In 1509, he began what would be his last expedition, again with Ojeda, to take possession of the coasts of modern Colombia.

De la Cosa died in an armed confrontation with indigenous people before he could get possession of Urabá.

== Origin and youth ==
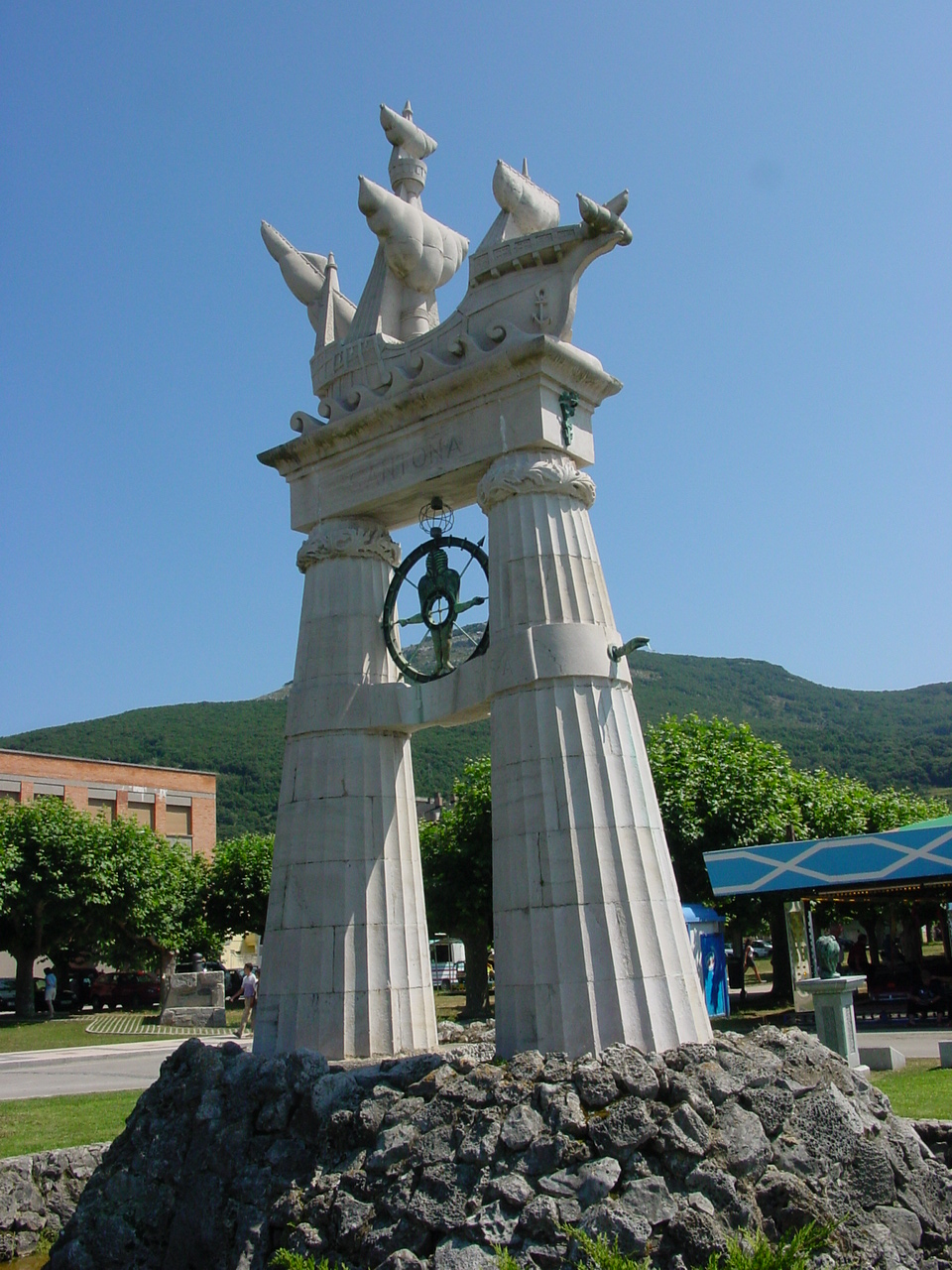
Monument dedicated to Juan de la Cosa in Santoña, Cantabria.

No one knows exactly where Juan de la Cosa was born. Canovas del Castillo (1892) states that he was from Santoña, Cantabria, because there are documents showing that he was a resident there and his wife and daughter lived in that city. Some 16th-century chroniclers called him "the Biscayne", leading to confusion with another sailor called "Juan Vizcaino". However, today they are known to be different people.

His date of birth is also unknown, but it is estimated between 1450 and 1460, nor is any information available from his childhood or adolescence. It is assumed that the young man took part in sailing voyages around the Bay of Biscay and then towards the Canary Islands and West Africa.

The first solid references come from 1488, when Juan de la Cosa was in Portugal. At that time, navigator Bartolomeu Dias had just arrived in Lisbon, after having reached the Cape of Good Hope. The Catholic Monarchs may have sent de la Cosa to that city as a spy to obtain information and details of the discovery. He managed to return to Castile before Portuguese officers captured him.

Early in the 1490s, Juan de la Cosa was living in El Puerto de Santa María and owned a ship called Marigalante or Galician. It is believed that it was there that he established a business relationship with the Pinzón brothers.

== Travels ==
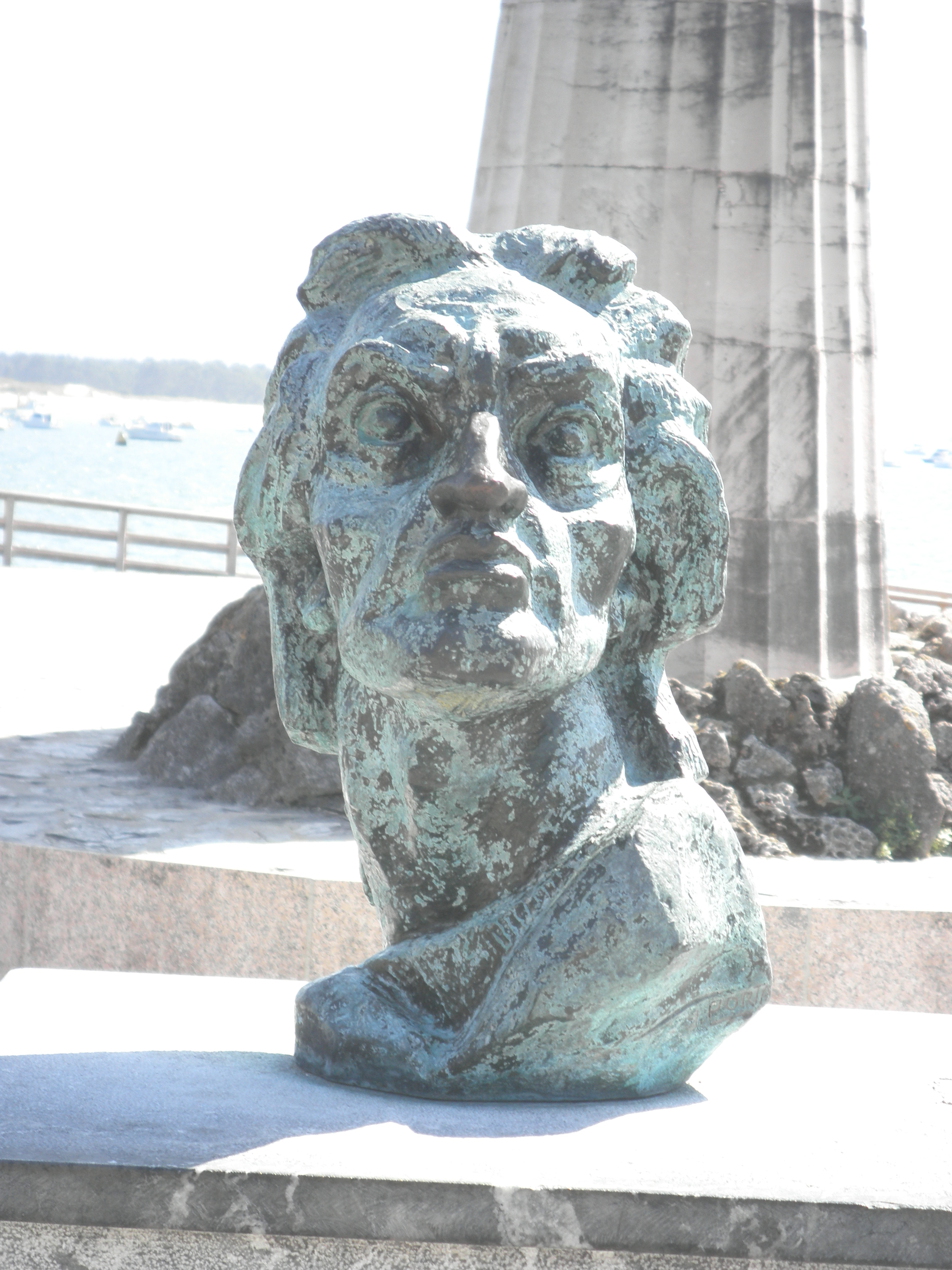
Bust of Juan de la Cosa, Santoña

=== Travels with Christopher Columbus ===
Juan de la Cosa sailed with Christopher Columbus on his first three voyages to the New World . He owned and was master of the Santa María (second-in-command to Columbus), flagship of Columbus's first voyage in 1492. The vessel shipwrecked that year on the night of 24–25 December off the present-day site of Cap-Haïtien, Haiti. De la Cosa, in a notable act of cowardice (or treason, in Columbus's documented opinion), fled the sinking Santa Maria (his partial ownership of the vessel notwithstanding) in the flagship's boat, rather than endeavor to assist Columbus in kedging the stricken vessel from off the coral reef on which it had run aground. He and a handful of loyals made for La Nina, waiting a few hundred yards astern of the flagship, but they were turned back by La Nina's captain Vicente Yanez.

On Columbus's second voyage, in 1493, de la Cosa was mariner and cartographer on the ship Colina. On Columbus' third voyage, in 1498, de la Cosa was on the ship La Niña. Some historians believe de la Cosa did not participate in this voyage.

In 1494 de la Cosa received compensation from the Spanish monarchs for the sinking of his ship on his first voyage. He was awarded the right to transport docientos cahíces de trigo ("two hundred cahices of flour") from Andalucia to Biscay, and was exempted from certain duties.

=== First voyage with de Ojeda ===
On his fourth voyage, in 1499, de la Cosa was the first pilot for the expedition of Alonso de Ojeda and Amerigo Vespucci, and with them was among the first to set foot on the South American mainland on the Gulf of Paria. At the same time they explored the coast from Essequibo River to Cape Vela.

In spite of not receiving much remuneration, De la Cosa had benefited considerably, having mapped in detail the coast of the region he explored, information he would use to create his famous map.

On the fifth voyage, in 1500, de la Cosa, Rodrigo de Bastidas, and Vasco Núñez de Balboa explored the lands of present-day Colombia and Panama. He explored further along the South American coast to the isthmus of Panama, and returned to Haiti in 1502. When the Spanish court found soon afterwards that the Portuguese had made several incursions into the newly discovered country, Queen Isabella sent Juan de la Cosa at the head of a delegation to Portugal to protest this incursion. De la Cosa was arrested and incarcerated, liberated only with the help of Queen Isabella.

=== First independent voyage ===
De la Cosa was nominated an alguazil, and in 1504–1505(?) (or 1506) was commander of an expedition to the Pearl Islands and the Gulf of Urabá to found settlements there. At the same time, he visited Jamaica and Haiti.

=== Second voyage with de Ojeda and de la Cosa's death ===
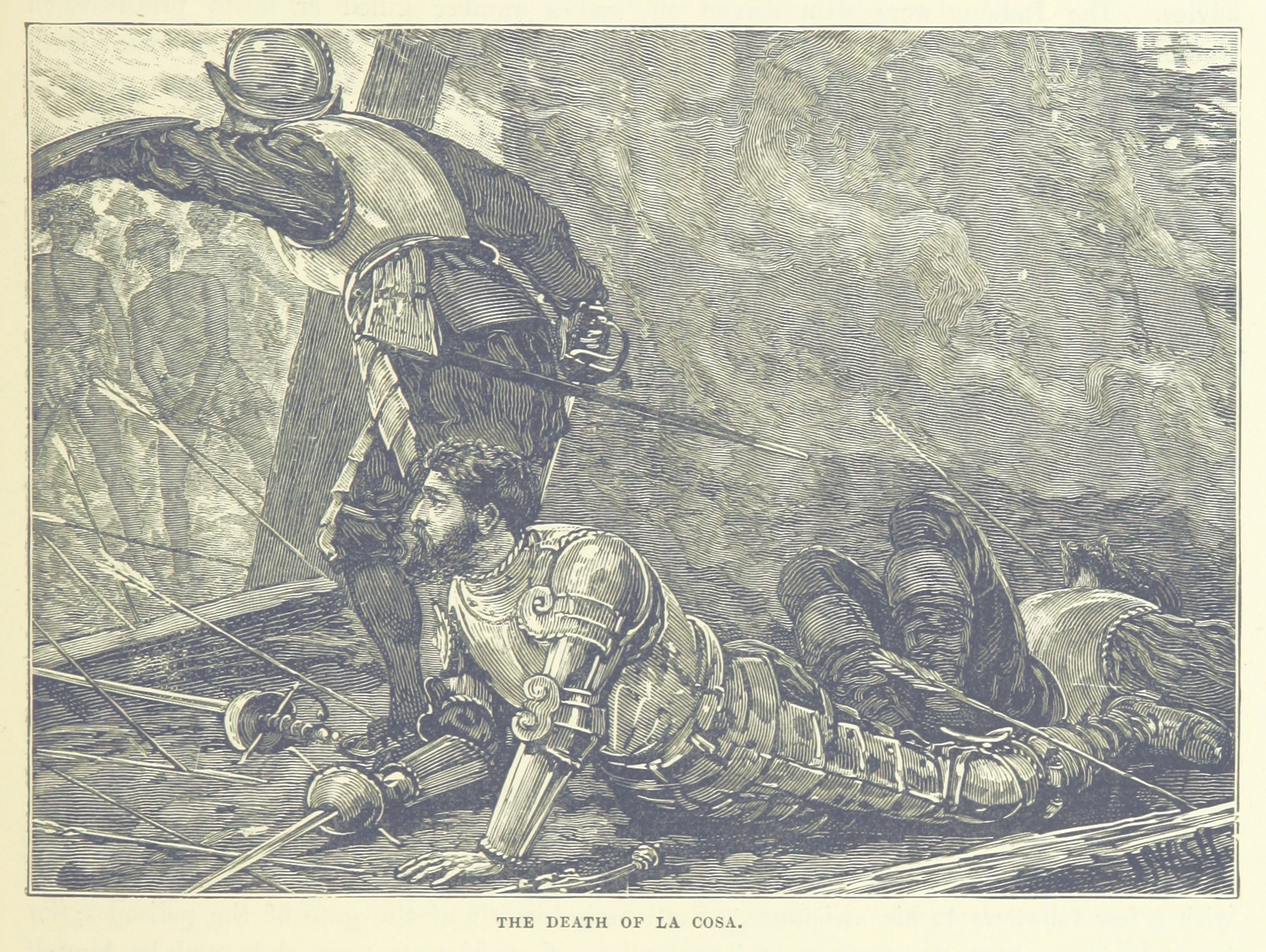
An 1887 illustration of de la Cosa's death

In 1509 Juan de la Cosa set out for the seventh and last time for the New World. He carried two hundred colonists on three ships, and on reaching Haiti placed himself under the command of Alonso de Ojeda, who added another ship with one hundred settlers to the expedition. After having settled an old border dispute between Alonso de Ojeda and Diego de Nicuesa, they went with Francisco Pizarro into de Ojeda's territory and landed at the future site of Cartagena. This was against the warnings of de la Cosa, who proposed they disembark on the more peaceful coast of the Gulf of Urabá. When the Spanish came ashore, they got in a fight with the natives on the Bay of Calamar, and drove them off. Emboldened by the Spanish victory, de Ojeda decided to go further into the forest, to the native village at the future site of Turbaco. When they arrived at the town, they were attacked by the natives, and de la Cosa was shot with poison arrows and killed. De Ojeda escaped and fled to the coast. Another Spanish expedition passed by, and de Ojeda told them of the murderous natives. The men of the other expedition joined de Ojeda for a punitive attack on that village, killing all of its inhabitants to avenge de la Cosa's death. De la Cosa's widow received 45,000 maravedís and all the natives he had in his possession as indemnity for services rendered.

== Cartography ==
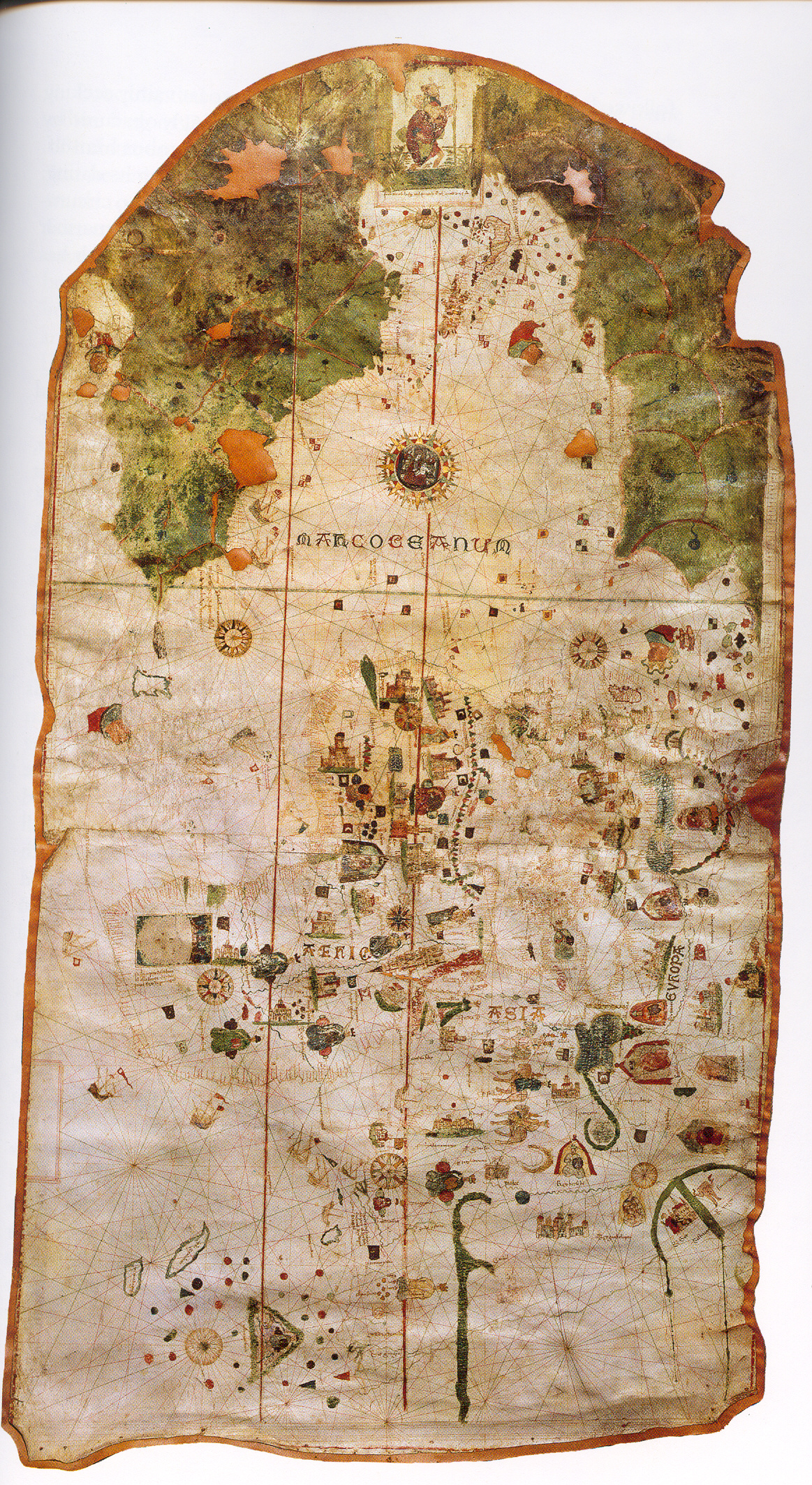
Map of Juan de la Cosa.

Juan de la Cosa made several maps of which the only survivor is his famous world map from 1500. It is the oldest known European map that shows the New World. Of special interest is the outline of Cuba, which Christopher Columbus never believed to be an island. Walkenaer and Alexander von Humboldt were the first to point out the great importance of this chart. It is now in the Museo Naval in Madrid. Reproductions of it were first given by Humboldt in his Atlas géographique et physique.

== See also ==
- List of explorers
- List of cartographers
- List of conquistadors
- Voyages of Christopher Columbus
- The Pinzon Brothers
- Columbian Exchange or The Grand Exchange

== Bibliography ==
- Davies, Arthur (1976). "The Date of Juan de la Cosa's World Map and Its Implications for American Discovery". The Geographical Journal. 142 (1): 111–116. Bibcode:1976GeogJ.142..111D. doi:10.2307/1796030. JSTOR 1796030.
- Floyd, Troy (1973). The Columbus Dynasty in the Caribbean, 1492-1526. Albuquerque: University of New Mexico Press. p. 135.
- Harley, J. B. (1992). "Cosa, Juan de la". The Christopher Columbus Encyclopedia. Vol. 1. Simon & Schuster. pp. 213–215.
- Phillips, William D.; Phillips, Carla Rahn (1992). The Worlds of Christopher Columbus. Cambridge University Press.
- Sauer, Carl Ortwin (1966). The Early Spanish Main. University of California Press.
- Vigneras, Louis-Andre (1976). The Discovery of South America and the Andalusian Voyages. University of Chicago Press. ISBN 9780226856094.
- Weddle, Robert S. (1985). Spanish Sea: The Gulf of Mexico in North American Discovery, 1500-1685. Texas A&M University Press.

=== Non-English ===
- Cánovas del Castillo y Vallejo, Antonio (1892). Ensayo biográfico del célebre navegante y consumado cosmógrafo Juan de la Cosa y descripción e historia de su famosa carta geográfica (PDF) (in Spanish). Madrid: Tipo-Litografía de la V. Faure.
- Humboldt, Alexander (1836–1839). Examen critique de l'histoire de la géographie du Nouveau Continent, et des progrès de l'astronomie nautique aux 15me et 16me siècles (in French). Paris: Gide.
- León Guerrero, María Montserrat (2000). El segundo viaje colombino (PDF) (PhD) (in Spanish). University of Valladolid.
- López de Gómara, Francisco (1553). Historia General de las Indias (in Spanish). Medina del Campo.
- Manzano Manzano, Juan (1988). Los Pinzones y el Descubrimiento de América (in Spanish). Madrid: Ediciones de Cultura Hispánica. ISBN 978-84-7232-442-8.
- O'Donnell, Hugo. "Juan de la Cosa". Historia Hispanica. Real Academia de la Historia.
- Sánchez, Antonio (2013), La espada, la cruz y el Padrón: Soberanía, fe y representación en el mundo ibérico bajo la Monarquía Hispánica, 1503-1598.
