= Map of Juan de la Cosa =

World map made in 1500

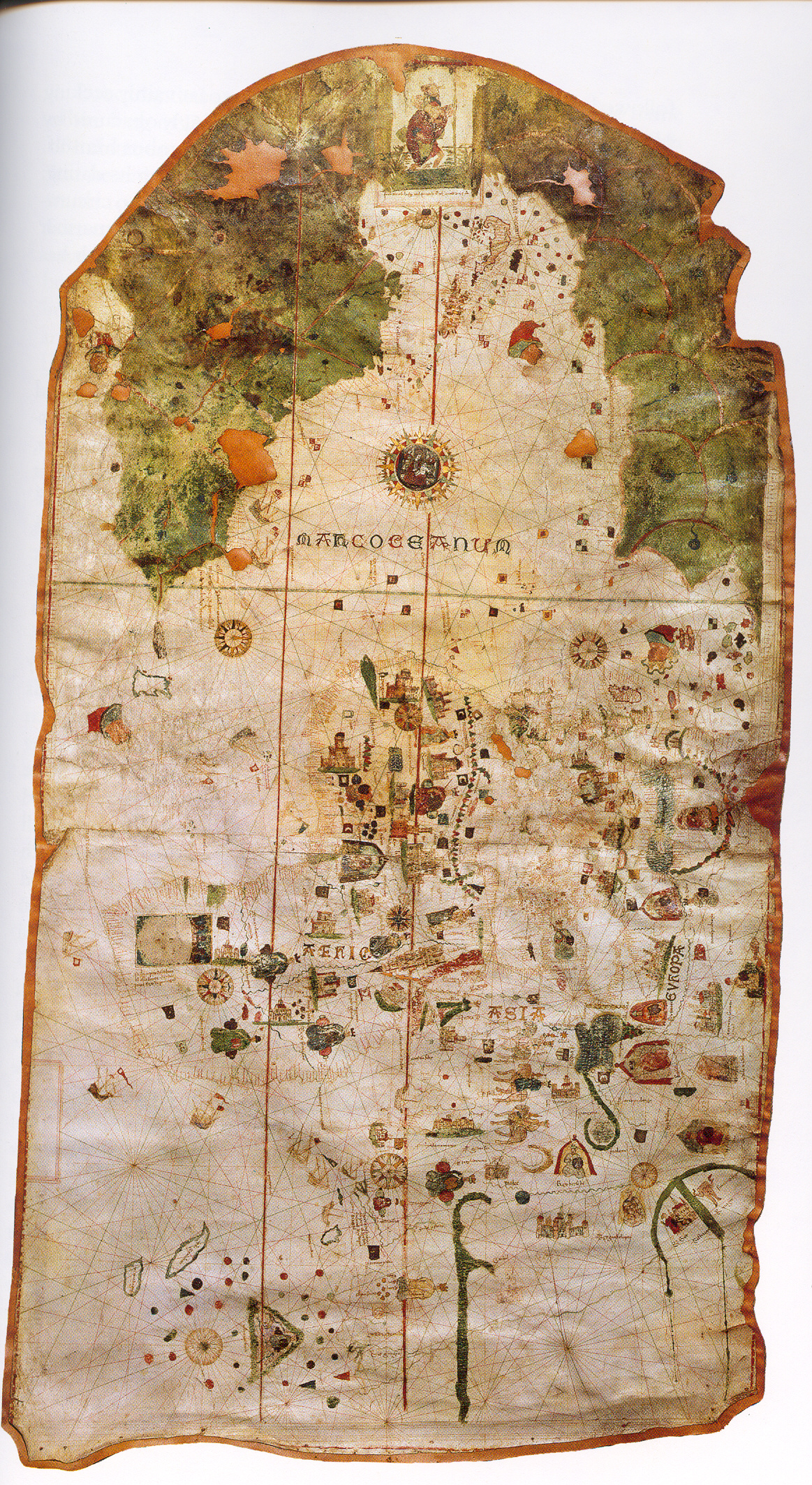
Map of Juan de la Cosa in its original orientation

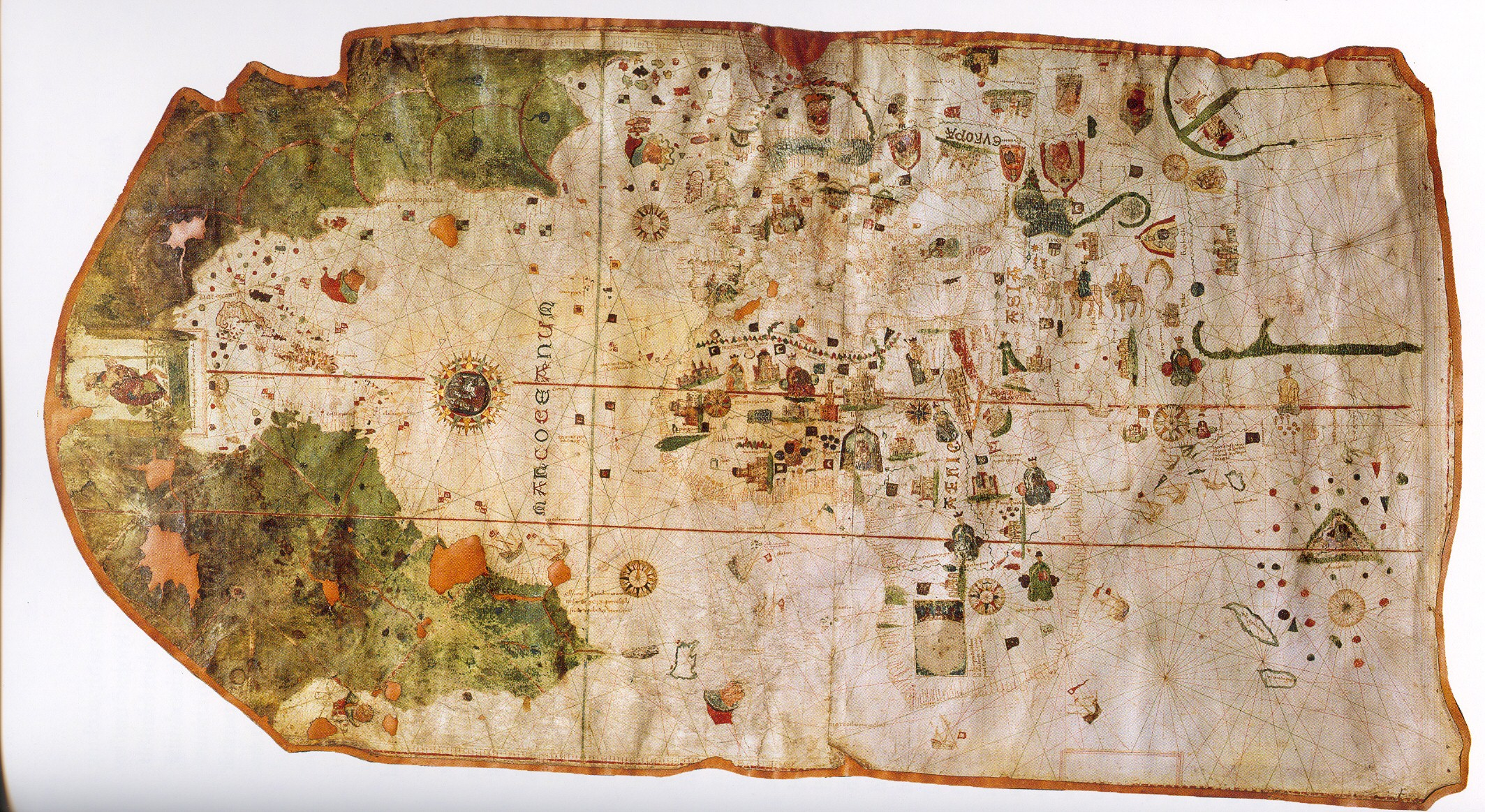
Rotated to match modern map orientations

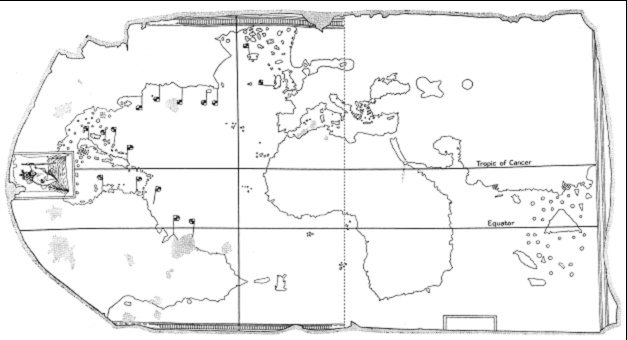
Rotated and outlined

The map of Juan de la Cosa is a world map that includes the earliest known representation of the New World and the first depiction of the equator and the Tropic of Cancer on a nautical chart. The map is attributed to the Castilian navigator and cartographer Juan de la Cosa and was likely created in 1500.

== Description ==
Juan de la Cosa's map is a manuscript nautical chart of the world drawn on two joined sheets of parchment sewn onto a canvas backing. It measures 96 cm high by 183 cm wide. A legend written in Spanish at the western edge of the map translates as "Juan de la Cosa made this (map) in the port of Santa Maria in the year 1500". The overall style is similar to other contemporary charts of the Mediterranean, especially maps produced in Majorca, an important center of map making at the time.

The map is an assemblage of two different charts, one covering the Old World and the Atlantic as far west as the Azores and the other representing the New World. The New World is colored in green while the Old World has been left uncolored. The Old World map includes discoveries made up to 1488 but the New World is current up to 1500. The two maps are also drawn at different scales, the New World chart larger than its Old World counterpart. It contains the earliest known depiction of the equator and the Tropic of Cancer on a nautical chart.

The portrayal of Europe, Africa, and Asia is unremarkable. The outlines of Europe and the Mediterranean Sea were certainly copied from portolan charts widely available at the time. The western and southern coasts of Africa show up-to-date knowledge of Portuguese explorations, but the eastern coast of the continent is badly distorted. Asia and the Indian Ocean reflect the Ptolemaic mapping tradition.

While the mapping of the Old World is routine, the inclusion of the New World is an important milestone in cartography. Cosa's map is the earliest surviving representation of the Americas. It is also the only known cartographic work made by an eyewitness of the first voyages of Christopher Columbus. Cosa also participated in the 1496 voyage of Alonso de Ojeda along the coast of South America. In addition, he takes into account the explorations of John Cabot, Vicente Pinzon, and Pedro Álvares Cabral. The appropriate national flags were drawn on the map to attribute the discovery of each region.

North America is depicted as a landmass extending far into the North Atlantic, and South America appears to be a continent but both are drawn in such a way that they could represent an extension of Asia and not entirely new continents. The Caribbean islands of Cuba, Hispaniola, and Puerto Rico are rendered with some accuracy. In particular, Cuba is drawn correctly as an island, which contradicts Columbus, who stated that it was a peninsula of Asia. The first recorded circumnavigation of Cuba did not occur until 1508.

The region of Central America is covered with an image of Saint Christopher bearing the infant Christ across the water. It has been suggested that this symbolizes Christopher Columbus bringing Christianity across the Atlantic. It also serves to leave open the possibility that a passage to the Indian Ocean exists in the region. Columbus firmly believed in this passage and the promise of easy access to the lucrative spice trade was probably what convinced King Ferdinand II and Queen Isabella I of Spain to fund a fourth (and final) voyage for Columbus.

Columbus may have presented the chart to Ferdinand and Isabella in 1503 and then later it was passed on to Juan Rodríguez de Fonseca, the councilor to the king. Nothing else is known of the map until it was purchased from a junk shop dealer in Paris by Baron Charles Athanase Walckenaer early in the nineteenth century. In 1832 the German naturalist Alexander von Humboldt first identified it as an important historical document. It was purchased by the Spanish government in 1853 and is part of the collection of the Naval Museum in Madrid.

Comparison of coastal outlines on maps of Juan de la Cosa and Martin Behaim with the true coastline

== See also ==
- Ancient world maps
- World map
- Cantino planisphere

== Bibliography ==
- Alvarez, Aldo (2003). "Geomagnetism and the Cartography of Juan de la Cosa: A New Perspective on the Greater Antilles in the Age of Discovery". Terrae Incognitae. 35 (1): 1–15. doi:10.1179/tin.2003.35.1.1. ISSN 0082-2884. S2CID 140189940.
- Alves Gaspar, Joaquim (2017-01-02). "The Planisphere of Juan de la Cosa (1500): The First Padrón Real or the Last of Its Kind?". Terrae Incognitae. 49 (1): 68–88. doi:10.1080/00822884.2017.1295600. ISSN 0082-2884. S2CID 218690293.
- Davies, Arthur (1976). "The Date of Juan de la Cosa's World Map and Its Implications for American Discovery". The Geographical Journal. 142 (1): 111–116. Bibcode:1976GeogJ.142..111D. doi:10.2307/1796030. JSTOR 1796030.
- Fernandez-Armesto, Felipe (2007). "Maps and Exploration in the Sixteenth and Early Seventeenth Centuries". In Woodward, David (ed.). The History of Cartography, Volume 3: Cartography in the European Renaissance, Part 1 (PDF). University of Chicago. pp. 1183–1188. ISBN 978-0-226-90734-5.
- Harley, J. B.; Tilton, David W. (1992). "Cosa, Juan de la". In Bedini, Silvio A. (ed.). The Christopher Columbus Encyclopedia. Vol. 1. Simon and Schuster.
- Lester, Toby (2009). The fourth part of the world (1st ed.). New York: Free Press. ISBN 978-1-4165-3531-7. OCLC 300279775.
- Macias, Luis A. Robles (2010). "Juan de la Cosa's Projection: A Fresh Analysis of the Earliest Preserved Map of the Americas" (PDF). MAGERT: ALA Map and Geography Roundtables. Series A, no. 9.
- Smith, James L. (28 November 2014). "Europe's confused transmutation: the realignment of moral cartography in Juan de la Cosa's Mappa Mundi (1500)". European Review of History: Revue européenne d'histoire. 21 (6): 799–816. doi:10.1080/13507486.2014.960813. S2CID 159903523.
- Weddle, Robert S. (1985). Spanish Sea : the Gulf of Mexico in North American Discovery : 1500-1685. College Station, Tex.: Texas A & M University Press. ISBN 0-89096-211-1. OCLC 803191426.
- Wolff, Hans, ed. (1992). America: Early Maps of the New World. Munich: Prestel. pp. 44–45. ISBN 3791312324.

Non-English

- MARTÍN MERÁS, Luisa (2000). "La carta de Juan de la Cosa: interpretación e historia". Monte Buciero (Ayuntamiento de Santoña) (in Spanish) (4): 71–86. ISSN 1138-9680.
- ELKHADEM, Hossam; et al. (1992). "Juan de La Cosa, Parte correspondiente a la America de la Carta General de Juan de La Cosa..." Cartes de Amériques dans les collections de la Bibliothèque Royale Albert Ier (in French). Bibliothèque Royale Albert Ier. Archived from the original on December 5, 2011.
