= Medeiros =

Medeiros may refer to:

== People ==
- Alessandra Medeiros (born 1981), Brazilian handball player
- António Joaquim de Medeiros (1846-1897), Portuguese Roman Catholic bishop
- Bona Medeiros (1930-2017), Brazilian lawyer and politician
- Borges de Medeiros (1863-1961), Brazilian lawyer and politician
- Diego Medeiros (born 1993), Brazilian footballer
- Diogo Medeiros (born 1985), Brazilian footballer
- Eduardo de Medeiros (1923-2002), Brazilian modern pentathlete
- Elli Medeiros (born 1956), Uruguayan-French singer and actress
- Elza Medeiros (1921-2009), Brazilian nurse
- Emo de Medeiros (born 1979), Beninese artist
- Etiene Medeiros (born 1991), Brazilian swimmer
- Fernando Medeiros (born 1996), Brazilian footballer
- Flávio Medeiros (born 1996), Brazilian footballer
- Glenn Medeiros (born 1970), American singer and songwriter
- Ginny Scales-Medeiros, American author
- Humberto Sousa Medeiros (1915–1983), Portuguese-American clergyman
- Inês de Medeiros (born 1968), Portuguese actress
- Iuri Medeiros (born 1994), Portuguese footballer
- Jason Medeiros (born 1989), Portuguese-Canadian football offensive lineman
- José Antonio Medeiros (born 1970), Brazilian politician
- Justin Medeiros (born 1999), American athlete
- Kaline Medeiros (born 1979), Brazilian mixed martial artist
- Keely Medeiros (born 1987), Brazilian shot putter
- SuperGirlKels (Kelsy Medeiros, born 1995), Canadian esports player
- Kodi Medeiros (born 1996), American baseball pitcher
- Léo Medeiros (born 1981), Brazilian footballer
- Leonardo Medeiros (born 1964), Brazilian actor
- Lionel Medeiros (born 1977), French-Portuguese footballer
- Lyara Medeiros (born 1996), Brazilian volleyball player
- Maria de Medeiros (born 1965), Portuguese actress
- Martha Medeiros (born 1961), Brazilian journalist
- Medeiros e Albuquerque (1867–1934), Brazilian author
- Mr. J. Medeiros (born 1977), American rapper, record producer, and songwriter
- Raúl Medeiros (born 1975), Bolivian footballer
- Ray Medeiros (1926-2003), American baseball player
- Renato Medeiros (born 1982), Brazilian footballer
- Richard De Medeiros (born 1940), Beninese film director
- Rodrigo Medeiros (born 1977), Brazilian jiu-jitsu world champion
- Teresa Medeiros (born 1962), American novelist
- Thiago Medeiros (born 1982), Brazilian racecar driver
- Titina Medeiros (1977–2026), Brazilian actress
- Tracey Medeiros, American chef
- Tyler Medeiros (born 1995), Portuguese-Canadian singer-songwriter
- Yancy Medeiros (born 1987), American mixed martial artist
- Zackary Medeiros (born 1990), Canadian football placekicker

== Places ==
- Medeiros, Minas Gerais, town in Brazil
- Vila Medeiros (district of São Paulo), Brazil
- Medeiros Neto, municipality in Bahia, Brazil

== Music ==
- Medeiros (album), 1997 recording by the American band Wheat
- Glenn Medeiros (1987 album), eponymous 1987 recording

== See also ==
- Mederos, the Spanish-language variant
