= Francisco "Chamuscado" Sánchez =

Francisco "Chamuscado" Sánchez (c. 1512 – 1582) was a Spanish military leader.

== Biography ==
Due to the absence of records, Francisco Sánchez was born in 1512 possibly in an area not far from Huelva, Spain.

He was a captain of the Spanish military and a conquistador leader of the Chamuscado and Rodríguez Expedition to search and discover the Indian settlements beyond the jurisdiction of Nueva Vizcaya, New Spain. "Chamuscado" is Spanish for "scorched" as he was described as light-skinned winoth "scorched flaming red beard". The expedition departed the Spanish outpost of Santa Bárbara, Chihuahua, Mexico on June 5, 1581.

The expedition party forded the Rio Grande, possibly at La Junta de los Ríos where they visited the Jumano settlements near present-day Presidio, Texas. The expedition walked along the Rio Grande and crossed the west bank of present-day El Paso, TX in late December 1581.

In the Chamuscado expedition of 1581–1582, this led to the first steps in the founding of Spanish New Mexico and the future founding of La Villa Real de la Santa Fe, New Mexico de San Francisco de Asís by Juan de Oñate y Salazar.
