= Gabriela Medero =

Brazilian-Scottish civil engineer

Gabriela Maluf Medero (born 1976) is a civil engineer. Originally from Brazil, she works in Scotland as a professor and associate principal for enterprise in the Heriot-Watt University School of Energy, Geoscience, Infrastructure and Society. Her research includes the mechanical behavior of unsaturated soil, including the prediction of landslides after storms, and the use of recycled materials in building, including bricks made from construction waste and train track ballast made from recycled polyurethane.

== Education and career ==
Medero was educated in Brazil at the Federal University of Rio Grande do Sul, where she received an engineering degree in 1998, a master's degree in civil engineering in 2001, and a doctorate in civil engineering and geotechnics in 2005, after a "sandwich" PhD in Scotland at the University of Glasgow in 2004.

In 2009, she co-founded a spin-off company from Heriot-Watt University, Kenoteq, to commercialize the K-Briq. This is a brick she developed that is made from recycled construction waste and that, because it is unfired, does not use as much carbon in its manufacture as conventional bricks.

At Heriot-Watt University, Medero heads the Geotechnics and Innovative Construction Materials Research Group. She was appointed as associate principal for enterprise in 2022.

== Recognition ==
Medero was elected as a Fellow of the Royal Society of Edinburgh (FRSE) in 2024.
