= Gutierre de Cetina =

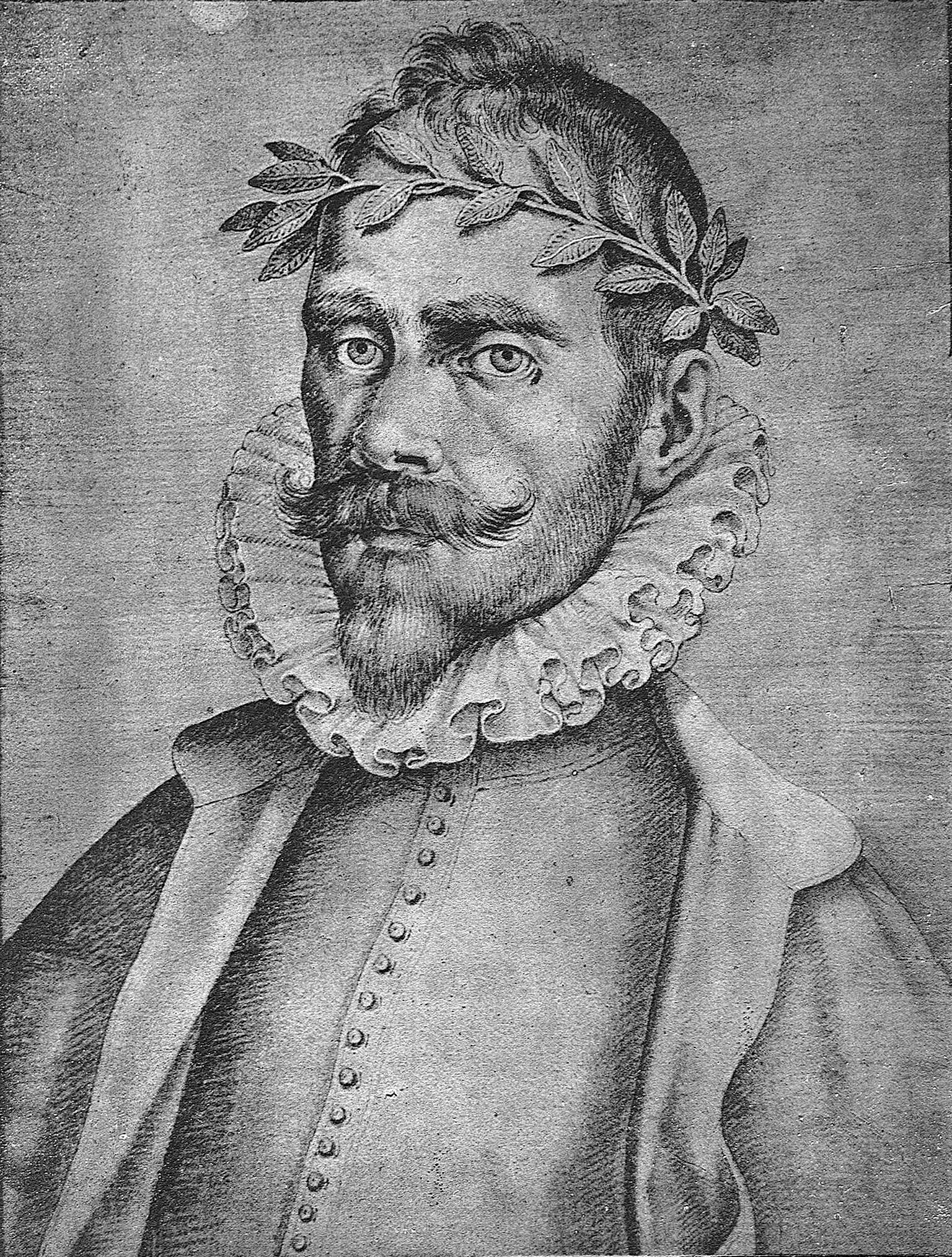
Portrait of Gutierre de Cetina (ca. 1599) by Francisco Pacheco

Gutierre de Cetina (1519–1554) was a Spanish poet and soldier.

== Biography ==
Cetina was born at Seville. He was the brother of Beltrán and Gregorio de Cetina, lesser known conquistadors. He served under Charles V in Italy and Germany, but retired from the army in 1545 to settle in Seville. Soon afterwards, however, he sailed for Mexico, where he resided for some time, and later returned to Mexico, where he fell victim some date previous to 1560 in Puebla to a morte galante.

A follower of Juan Boscán and Garcilaso de la Vega, a friend of Jerónimo Jiménez de Urrea and Baltasar del Alcázar, Cetina adopted the doctrines of the Italian school and, under the name of Vandalio, wrote an extensive series of poems in the newly introduced metres; his sonnets are remarkable for elegance of form and sincerity of sentiment, his other productions being in great part adaptations from Petrarch, Ariosto and Ludovico Dolce. His patrons were Antonio de Leyva, prince of Ascoli, Hurtado de Mendoza, and Alvas's grandson, the duke de Sessa, but he seems to have profited little by their protection. His works have been well edited by Joaquin Hazañas y la Rúa in two volumes published at Seville (1895).

== See also ==
- Beltrán de Cetina
