= 2019 Lakewood semi-truck crash =

Semi-truck traffic collision

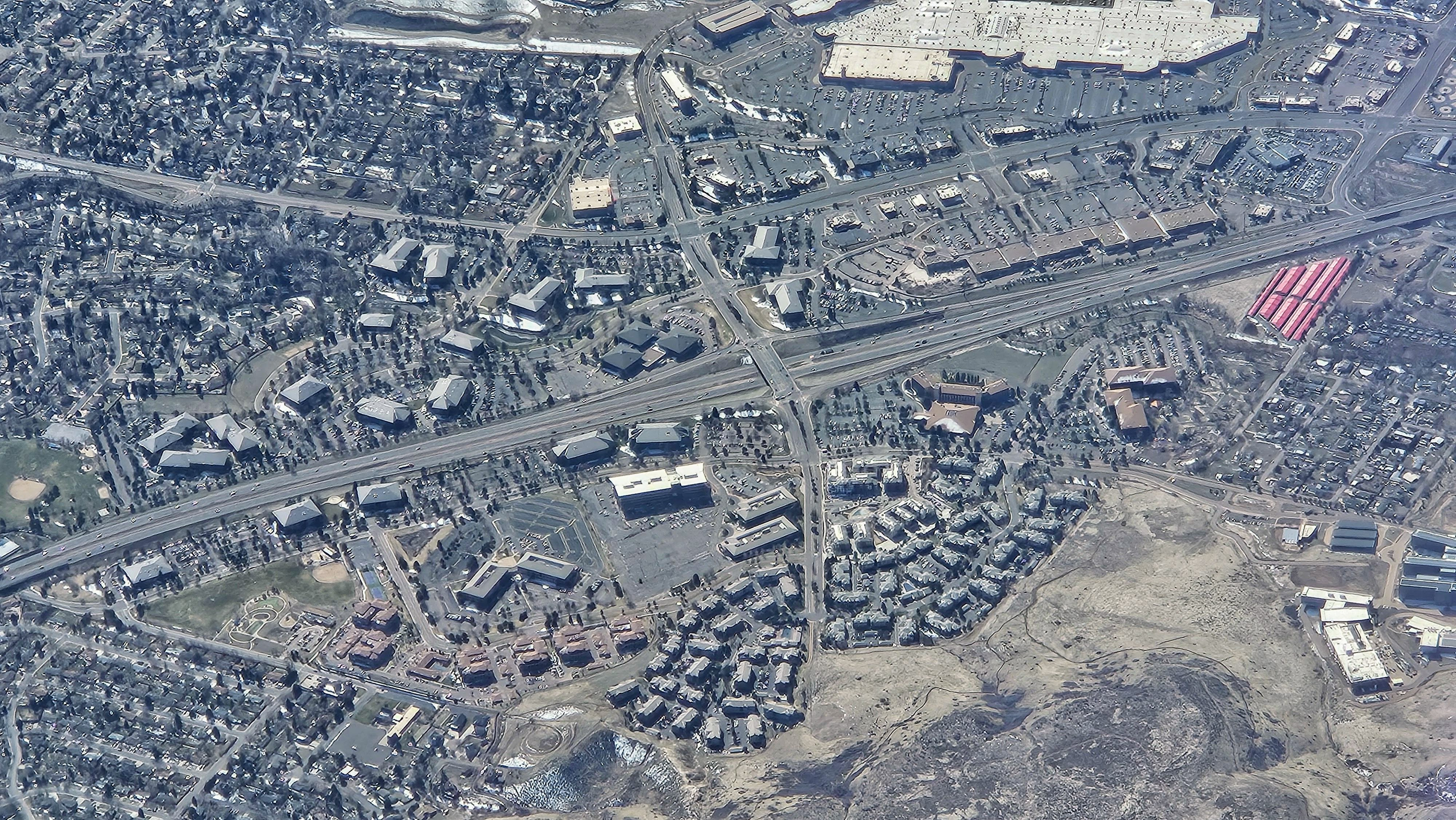
- The portion of Interstate 70 where the crash occurred. The crash happened just to the right side of the overpass.

- Location within Colorado Location within the United States

Details
- Date: April 25, 2019; 7 years ago 4:45 PM MDT
- Location: I-70 and Denver West Marriott Blvd. in Lakewood
- Coordinates: 39°44′24″N 105°09′32″W
- Country: United States
- Cause: Brake failure, driver error

Statistics
- Deaths: 4
- Injured: 10

On April 25, 2019, a deadly traffic collision occurred on Interstate 70 near Lakewood, Colorado, United States, when a semi-trailer truck's brakes allegedly malfunctioned, causing the truck to crash into 12 cars and three other semi-trailer trucks, resulting in multiple fires and explosions, killing four people. The truck was driven by Rogel Lazaro Aguilera Mederos, who was later convicted of vehicular homicide. He was originally sentenced to 110 years in prison, but it was lowered to 10 years.

== Incident ==
=== Precursor crash ===
Just after 4 p.m. MDT on April 25, 2019, an unrelated semi-trailer truck crashed into a Jefferson County Public Schools school bus on Interstate 70 at the Ward Road exit, resulting in ten injuries, and causing Interstate 70 to be closed eastbound from Ward Road (Exit 266) to Kipling Street (Exit 267). This, in-turn, created heavy congestion all the way to Colorado Mills Parkway (Exit 263). About 30 minutes later, all but the far left lanes remained closed, furthering traffic onto Colorado Mills Parkway.

=== Main crash ===
On the afternoon of April 25, Rogel Lazaro Aguilera Mederos was driving a semi-trailer truck carrying lumber on eastbound Interstate 70. Around 4:30 p.m. MDT, Aguilera Mederos lost control of his semi-trailer truck when his brakes malfunctioned while going down a mountainous stretch of Interstate 70. Aguilera Mederos was first reported speeding as he passed Genesee (Exit 254). After passing the Genesee exit, Aguilera Mederos's truck began to smoke as he passed a runaway truck ramp, without taking it, and instead drifted into the left lane, nearly clipping a white Chevy Silverado, and passed the next exit as well. For the next few minutes, Aguilera Mederos reached speeds upwards of 100 miles per hour (161 km/h) and passed the next four exits.

As Aguilera Mederos approached Colorado Mills Parkway, he tried to move the truck to the right shoulder to avoid colliding with stopped traffic caused by the precursor bus crash, but quickly swerved back into traffic when another semi-trailer truck was already in the right shoulder. Moments later, Aguilera Mederos's truck was seen speeding past a driver who was livestreaming while stopped at Colorado Mills Parkway (Exit 263). Seconds after speeding past the livestreamer, Aguilera Mederos crashed his semi-trailer truck into three other semi-trailer trucks and 12 vehicles. The lumber from Aguilera Mederos's semi-trailer, combined with the gasoline from the smashed cars, and the mattresses carried by a Beautyrest semi-trailer truck, created quick fuel for the fire to ignite and then quickly explode.

Within seconds of Aguilera Mederos's semi exploding, eastbound cars quickly drove over the median and into the Colorado Mills Parkway exit, causing immediate congestion. The first call went to Lakewood Emergency Officials around 4:50 p.m. Interstate 70 was officially closed eastbound and westbound at Colorado Mills Parkway by the Colorado Department of Transportation at 5:03 p.m. Interstate 70 would later be closed from Exit 261 to Exit 265 at 6:24 p.m. The fire was not fully under control and able to be investigated until 10 p.m. that night. Interstate 70 remained closed through the night and reopened at 8:20 p.m. on April 26.

== Aftermath ==
Four people were killed in the crash, all residents of Colorado: Doyle Harrison, 61, William Bailey, 67, Stanley Politano, 69, and Miguel Lamas Arellano, 24.

Mederos, a Cuban immigrant, survived the crash with no injuries and was booked into the Jefferson County jail the following morning, arrested on various charges related to the incident. Aguilera Mederos was initially under investigation for vehicular manslaughter but on May 3, 2019, the charges were revised to 40 different ones, including six counts of first degree assault and 24 counts of attempted first degree assault.

Since at least summer 2019, the Colorado Department of Transportation (CDOT) has been considering plans for an additional runaway truck ramp east (downhill) of the Mt. Vernon site. In November 2021, CDOT launched a survey, now closed, to solicit input on ramp design and placement.

== Trial ==
Mederos was arrested on April 26, 2019, and charged with multiple counts of vehicular homicide. Bail was set at $400,000, and Aguilera Mederos was released from jail on May 19, 2019, after posting bail. A judge granted his request to await trial in Texas, where he resides.

Aguilera Mederos's claim that his brakes failed to work could not be fully investigated due to the semi being completely destroyed in the flames. The company Aguilera Mederos was working for, Castellano 03 Trucking LLC, had received 30 safety violations in the two years prior to the crash. Some of the violations included employing truck drivers unable to understand English highway signs. Interstate 70 in Colorado contains many signs, only in English, between Genesee and Colorado Mills Parkway warning truckers of the steep grades, sharp curves, gear shifts, and locations of runaway truck ramps.

On November 21, 2019, Aguilera Mederos's attorney, Rob Corry, attempted to enter a motion to disqualify the state's prosecutors; but the judge denied the request, at which point Aguilera Mederos pleaded not guilty.

Aguilera Mederos's trial began on September 28, 2021, in Jefferson County. On October 25, 2021, a jury found Aguilera Mederos guilty of four counts of vehicular homicide; he was sentenced to 110 years in prison. Aguilera Mederos, who had been free on bail prior to his trial, was taken into custody immediately after the verdict. According to the sentencing judge, Bruce Jones, this was the statutory minimum for the crimes Aguilera Mederos had been convicted. Jones said that he did not agree with the sentence he was imposing but that legally the choice was out of his hands. This was disputed by Aguilera Mederos's attorneys however, who argued that the minimum sentence could be as low as twenty years. Aguilera Mederos's attorneys announced their intention to appeal the 110-year sentence almost immediately after it was imposed.

=== Reactions ===
The 110-year prison sentence for Aguilera Mederos was met with significant backlash.

Mark Silverstein, the legal director of the ACLU of Colorado, described the sentence as "grossly excessive". Silverstein criticized the prosecution, claiming they overcharged in an attempt to induce a guilty plea. In contrast, George Brauchler, who had served as a district attorney for Colorado's 18th Judicial District, disagreed, stating that he has "little sympathy for someone who turns down a reasonable plea bargain offer, and then goes to trial and bemoans the fact that the worst thing that could happen to them happened" and that the sentence was reasonable given that Aguilera Mederos killed four people.

As of December 17, 2021, almost five million people had signed a Change.org petition asking that either Aguilera Mederos sentence be commuted or he be granted clemency by Colorado governor Jared Polis. The petition agrees the accident was tragic and claims that the trucking company should be held liable for the accident instead of Aguilera Mederos. Polis's office released an initial statement regarding clemency for Aguilera Mederos: "We are aware of this issue, the Governor and his team review each clemency application individually." The Denver Post editorial board also called for a commuted sentence. The harsh sentence led to an outcry from many in the Latino community, with the League of United Latin American Citizens (LULAC) becoming a leading voice of support for Aguilera Mederos. Visible outrage was seen in the trucking community as well, with some drivers calling for a boycott of the State of Colorado.

=== Subsequent developments ===
Following the nationwide backlash, First Judicial District Attorney Alexis King, the lead prosecutor in the case who personally oversaw pursual of the charges which culminated in Aguilera Mederos's century-plus prison sentence, requested a re-sentencing hearing in his case, with their goal being a sentence ranging from 20 to 30 years.

On December 30, 2021, before the planned re-sentencing hearing, Governor Jared Polis commuted Aguilera Mederos's sentence from 110 years to 10 years.
