= Sebastián de Belalcázar =

Spanish conquistador (c.1490–1551)

Adelantado Sebastián de Belalcázar
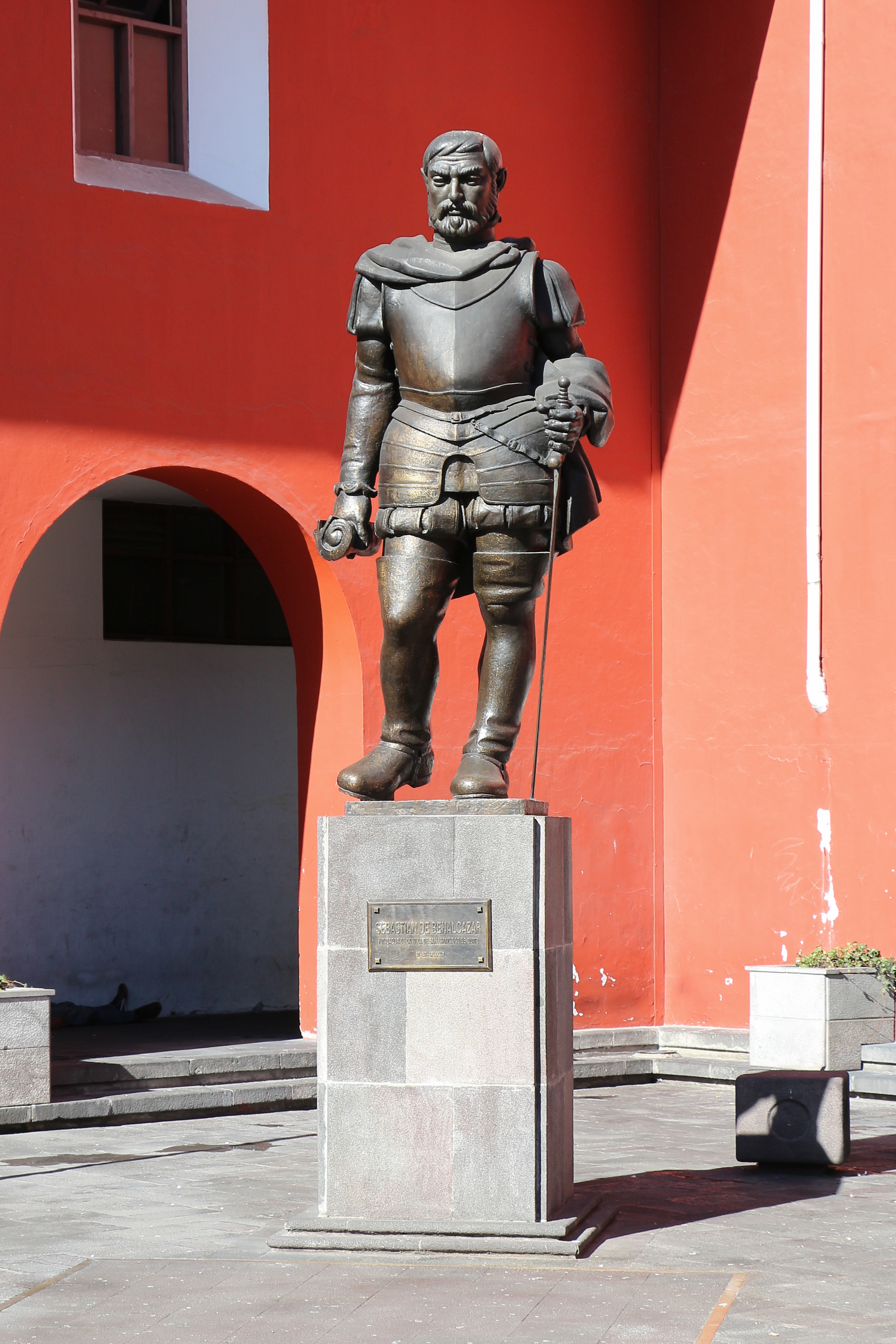
- Statue of Sebastián de Belalcázar in Quito, Ecuador
- Born: 1490; Córdoba, Crown of Castille
- Died: April 28, 1551; Cartagena de Indias, New Kingdom of Granada, Viceroyalty of Peru
- Other names: Sebastián de Benalcázar; Sebastián Moyano y Cabrera
- Occupation: Conquistador
- Known for: Spanish conquest of the Inca Empire; Conquest of the Muisca; Founder of Cali; Founder of Pasto; Founder of Popayán

Sebastián Moyano y Cabrera, best known as Sebastián de Belalcázar (Spanish pronunciation: [seβasˈtjan de βelalˈkaθaɾ]; c. 1490 – April 28, 1551) was a Spanish conquistador. Belalcázar, also written as Benalcázar. He is known as the founder of important early virreinal cities in the northwestern part of South America; Quito in 1534 and Cali, Pasto, and Popayán in 1537. Belalcázar led expeditions in present-day Ecuador and Colombia and died of natural causes after being sentenced to death in the port of Cartagena de Indias in 1551.

== Early life ==
He was born as Sebastián Moyano Cabrera in the province of Córdoba, Spain, in either 1479 or 1480. He took the name Belalcázar as that was the name of the castle-town near to his birthplace in Córdoba. According to various sources, he may have left for the New World with Christopher Columbus as early as 1498.

== Conquests ==
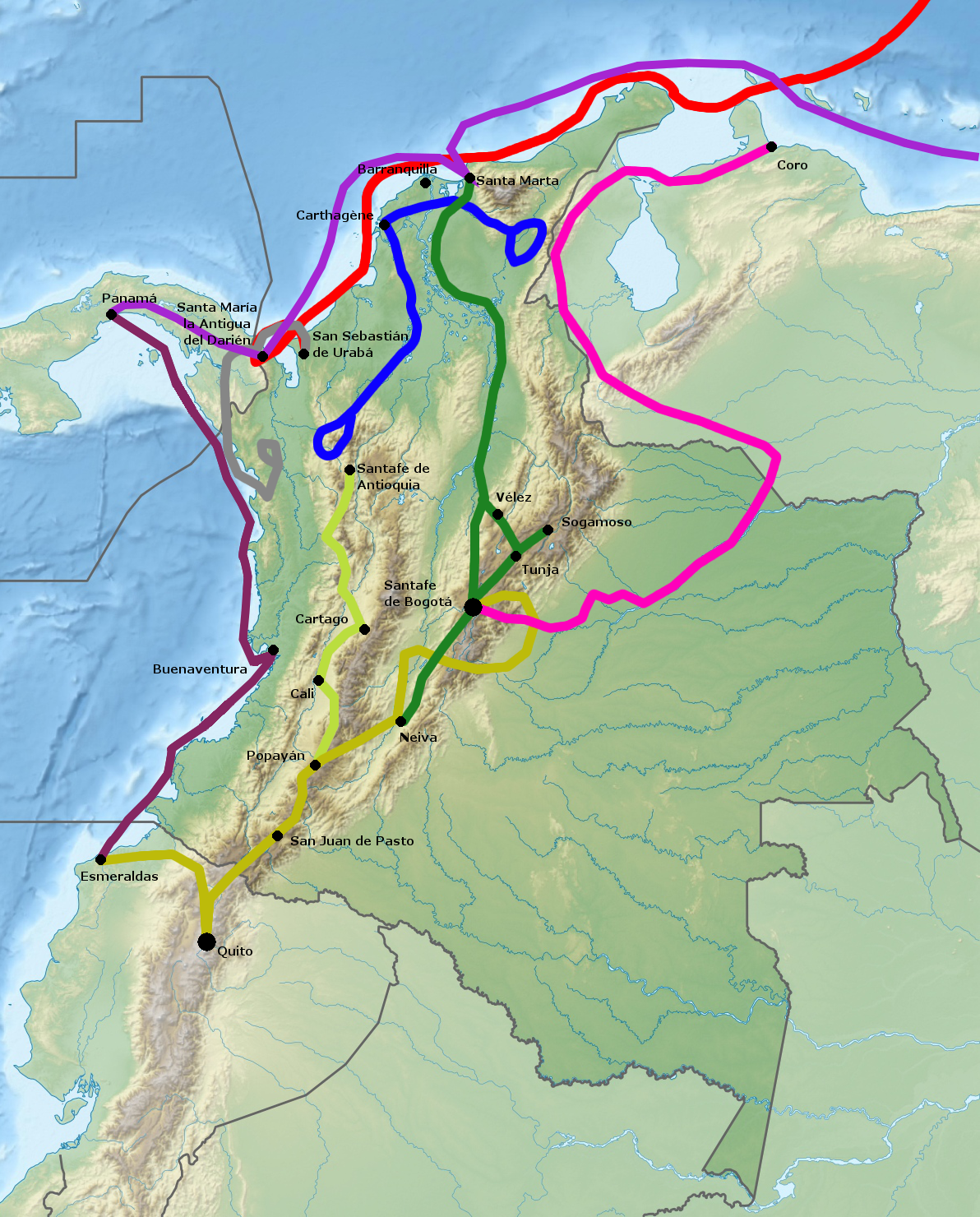
Routes of Spanish conquest in Colombia. De Belalcázar's approximate route from Quito to Bogotá in olive green. De Quesada's route in dark green

He was an encomendero in Panama in 1522. He entered Nicaragua with Francisco Hernández de Córdoba in 1524 during the conquest of Nicaragua, and became the first mayor of the city of León in Nicaragua. He remained there until 1527, when he left for Honduras as a result of internal disputes among the Spanish governors. Briefly returning to León, he sailed to the coast of Peru, where he united with the expedition of Francisco Pizarro in 1532.

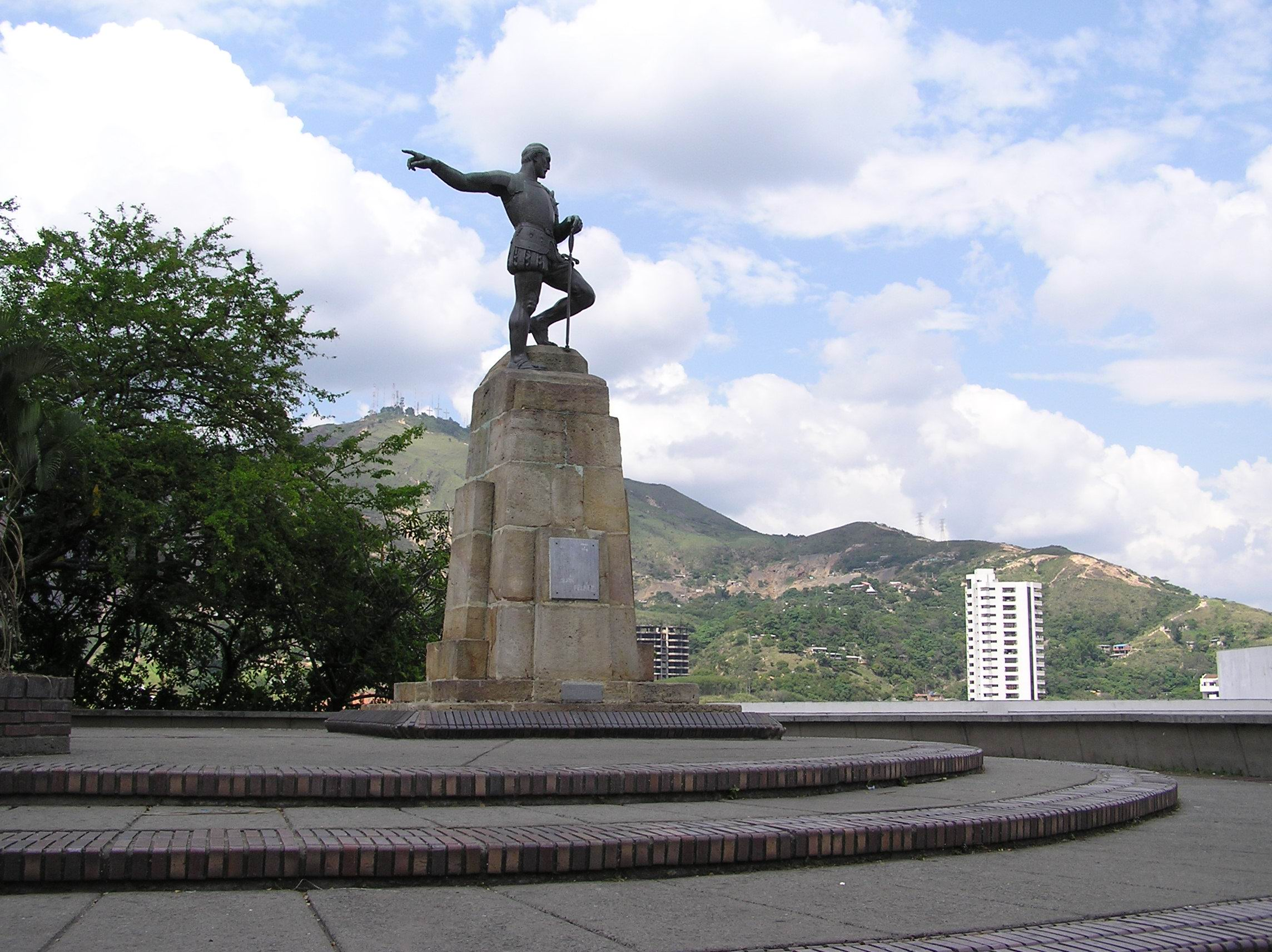
Statue of Sebastián de Belalcázar in the Colombian city of Santiago de Cali

In 1534, while commanding the settlement of San Miguel for Francisco Pizarro, Sebastian set off to conquer Quito in modern-day Ecuador, without orders from Pizarro. Quito had been the northernmost city of the Inca Empire, but while Belalcázar defeated the Inca general Rumiñahui, the local population secretly carried the city treasure away. Belalcázar then founded the new city of Quito with Diego de Almagro and Baltasar Maldonado, honoring Pizarro by naming it in full "San Francisco de Quito".

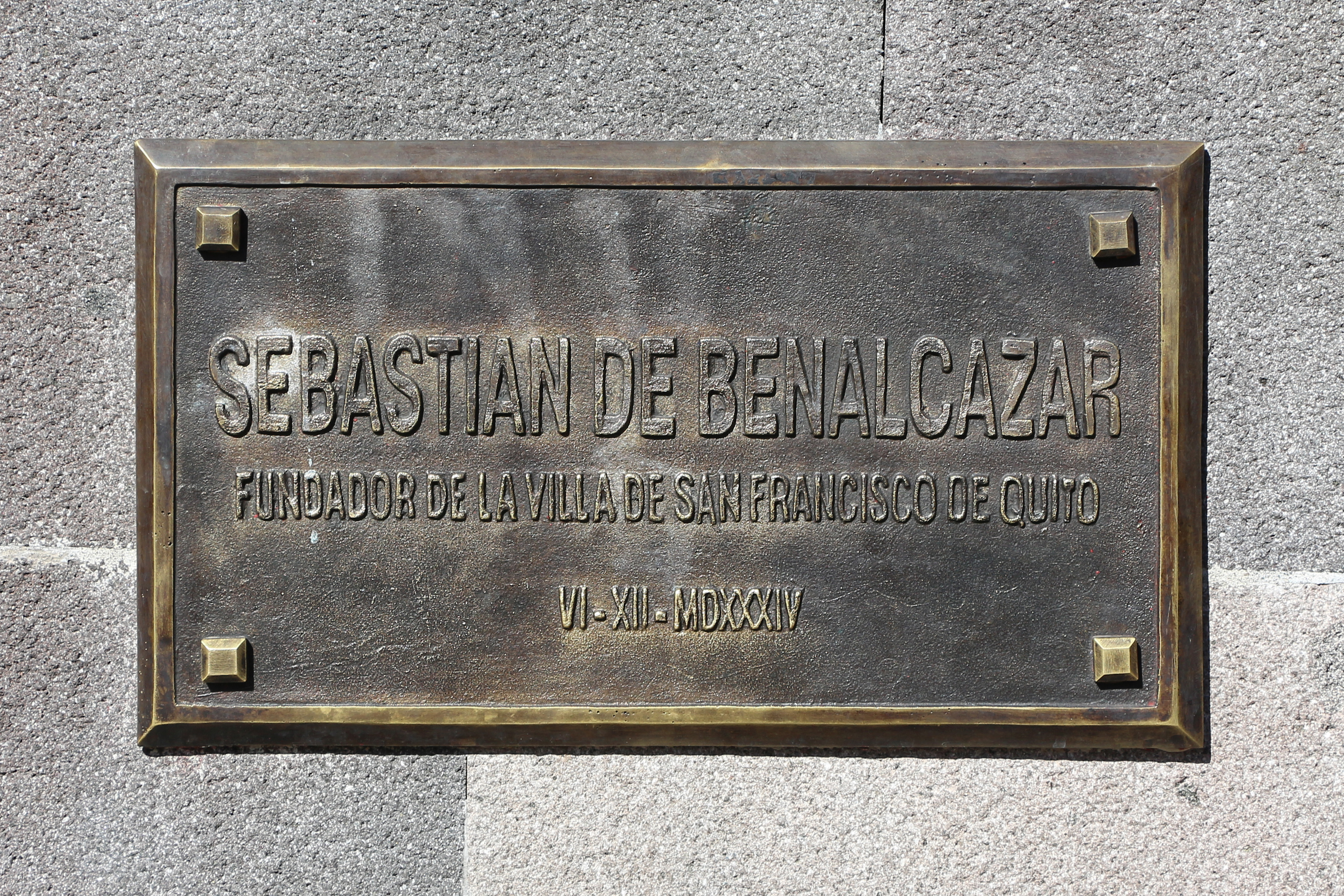
Plaque of Sebastián de Benalcázar in Quito, Ecuador

Moving northward into present day Colombia in search of El Dorado in 1535, he entered the Cauca River Valley, founding the southwestern Colombian cities of Santiago de Cali in 1536, and Pasto and Popayán (next in importance after Quito) in 1537. Crossing overland to the Magdalena River Valley, he entered the highlands of central Colombia, which had also been reached by Gonzalo Jiménez de Quesada and Nikolaus Federmann, a German, in 1539. The three presented their dispute before King and Holy Roman Emperor Charles V. The King granted Belalcázar rule of the area with the title of governor of Popayán and the honorary title of adelantado in May 1540. As so often happened among the conquistadors, land squabbles developed again, this time between Belalcázar and Pascual de Andagoya (1495–1548), who also claimed the governorship of Popayán. Belalcázar successfully defended his lands, and took over some of Andagoya's. He then intervened in a disagreement between supporters of the families of Pizarro and Almagro in Perú. In 1546, he ordered the execution of Jorge Robledo, who governed a neighboring province in yet another land-related vendetta. He was put to trial in absentia in 1550, convicted and condemned to death for the death of Robledo, and other offenses pertaining to his constant involvement in the various wars between other conquistadors. A victim of his own ambition, he died in 1551 before he could begin the voyage back to Spain to appeal the decision, in Cartagena, Colombia.

== See also ==
- List of conquistadors
- List of conquistadors in Colombia
- Decolonization of public space
- Spanish conquest of the Muisca
