= Cetina, Aragon =

- Municipality
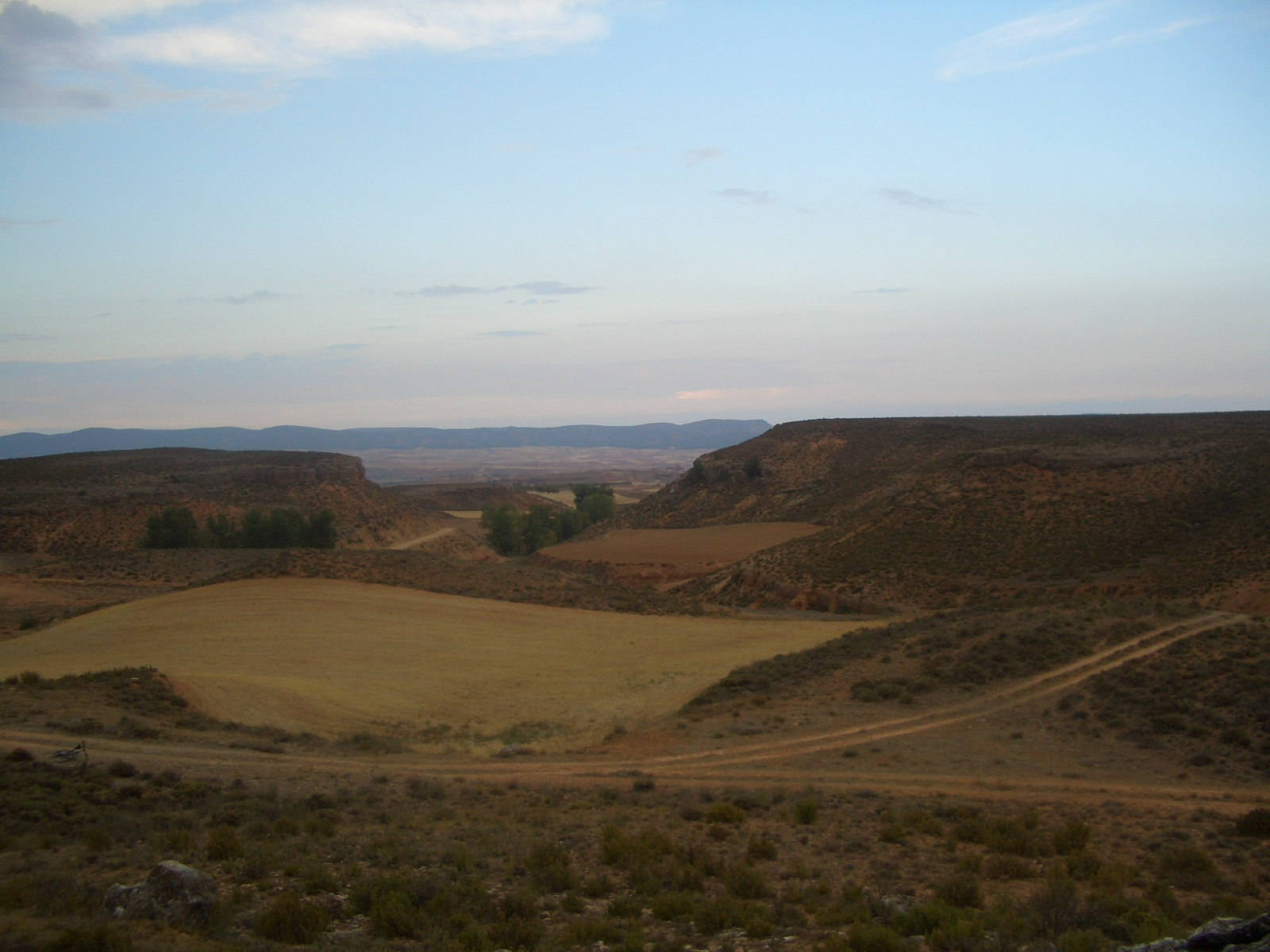

- Flag Coat of arms

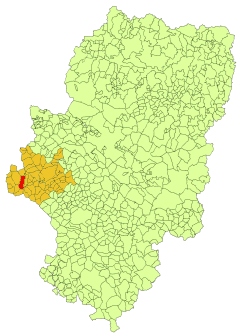
- Cetina in comarca de Calatayud

- Location within Aragon Location within Spain Location within Europe
- Country: Spain
- Autonomous community: Aragon
- Province: Zaragoza
- Comarca: Comunidad de Calatayud
- Municipality: Contamina

Government
  - Alcalde: José Miguel Velázquez

Area
  - Total: 78.76 km^{2} (30.41 sq mi)
- Elevation: 666 m (2,185 ft)

Population (2025-01-01)
  - Total: 534
  - Density: 6.78/km^{2} (17.6/sq mi)
- Time zone: UTC+1 (CET)
  - Summer (DST): UTC+2 (CEST)
- Website: http://www.cetina.es/

Cetina is a municipality in the province of Zaragoza, Aragon. It is situated at an altitude of 666 metres (2,185 ft) in the south east of the province, in the Comunidad de Calatayud, some 176 kilometres (109 mi) north east of Madrid and 98 kilometres (61 mi) south west of Zaragoza. The population in 2011 was 687.

== History ==
The origins of the settlement are unknown, but Ambrosio de Morales has identified Cetina as Certima or Celtima, a Celtiberian fort which was conquered by the Roman general Graco in 179 CE. The town lies on the Camino del Cid, the path taken by the medieval warrior, Rodrigo Díaz de Vivar, known as El Cid, according to the anonymous medieval poem, "El Cantar de Mio Cid", which follows the course of the river Jalón. The relevant lines state that "and they entered the plain of Torancio, and halted between Ariza and Cetina; great were the spoils which they collected as they went along." Cetina was granted its own fuero (law) by Guillén de Belles and Ramón Berenguer IV in the late 12th century.

In 1808, during the Peninsular War, the pueblo was pillaged by 18,000 French soldiers, commanded by Marshal Ney who occupied the area. In 1936, twelve members of the Unión General de Trabajadores, all hailing from Torrijo de la Cañada, a nearby village, were shot by nationalists and buried in a mass grave in Cetina. The bodies were exhumed in 2010 and returned to their families for burial.

== Buildings of interest ==
The castle stands on a small hill in the centre of the settlement. It is believed that it was captured by El Cid on his passage through the area. The castle chapel has some noted mudéjar decoration and was the location of the marriage of the 17th-century poet Francisco de Quevedo to Doña Esperanza de Mendoza in 1634. Nearby is the 15th-century parish church dedicated to San Juan Bautista (St John the Baptist).

== Contradanza ==
The "contradanza" is a folk dance peculiar to Cetina, held on 19 May, the feast of San Juan Lorenzo, a fourteenth-century martyr who was born in Cetina. It is performed by nine young men, four wearing black jackets trimmed with white, four wearing white jackets trimmed with black, whilst the ninth, "the Devil", wears red. The ritual sacrifice of the devil is enacted and the dancers create shapes with their bodies, the whole accompanied by a constant monotonous tune. The dance was first mentioned in reports from 1751. In 2012, the government of Aragon declared the contradanza to be a special part of Aragon's cultural heritage.

== Fiestas ==
- 17 January - San Antonio
- 19 May - San Juan Lorenzo and Santa Quiteria
- 22 May - pilgrimage to the hermitage of Santa Quiteria
- 19 October - Vergen de Atocha

== See also ==
- List of municipalities in Zaragoza
