= Beltrán de Cetina =

Conquistador in Yucatán, 16th century

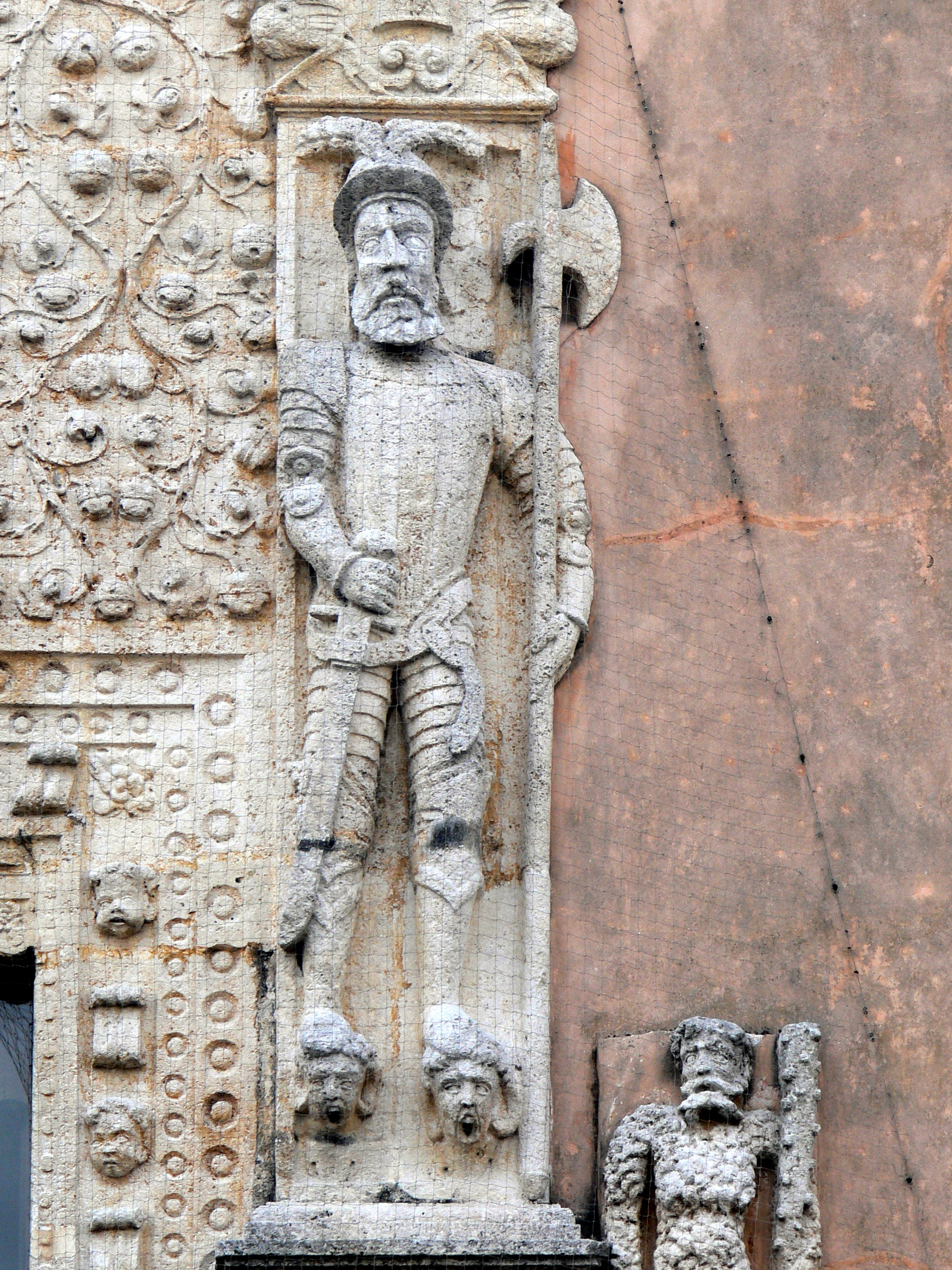
Relief of conquistador on facade of Casa de Montejo (built c. 1549), Mérida, Yucatán.

Beltrán de Cetina y del Castillo (Alcalá de Henares, 1521 – Mérida de Yucatán, 1600?) was one of the original conquistadors and founders of Mérida in the modern Mexican state of Yucatán. His siblings included: Renaissance poet Gutierre de Cetina; Ana Andrea del Castillo, self-described conquistadora and wife of Francisco de Montejo the Younger; and Gregorio de Cetina, also a conqueror of Yucatán.

== From Andalusia to Mexico ==
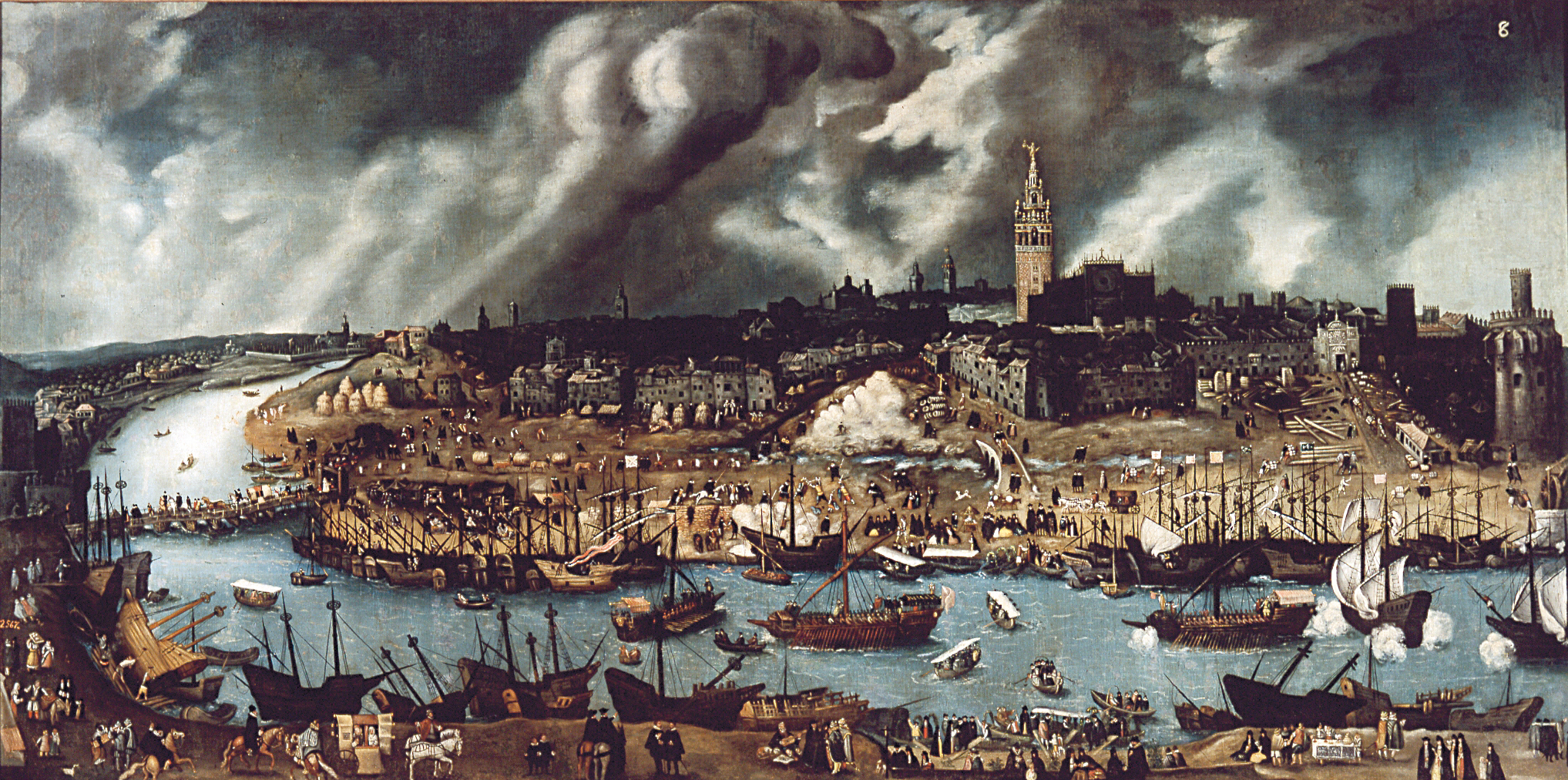
Seville, Andalusia, in the 16th century

His father, Beltrán de Cetina y Alcocer, was born to Gutierre de Cetina y Hurtado de Mendoza and Mencía de Alcocer (of partial converso ancestry) c. 1498. The parents came, for the most part, from old hidalgo families long resident in Alcalá de Henares, although the patrilineal descent ultimately stemmed from the village of Cetina, in the Kingdom of Aragon. As a youth Beltrán de Cetina y Alcocer moved to Seville, where he met and married Francisca del Castillo y Zanabria, daughter of García del Castillo and María Mayora, a local of likely Morisco descent. The nuptials were celebrated in 1518 in Seville. In 1519 was born Gutierre, in 1521 Beltrán in Alcalá de Henares, in 1525 Ana Andrea, and in 1527 Gregorio.

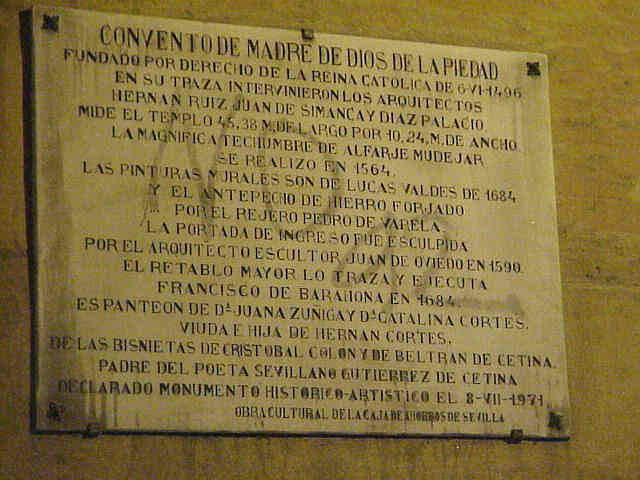
The plaque on the convent wall reads in part: This is the sepulchre of...Beltran de Cetina, father of...poet Gutierre de Cetina...

The family lived for many years in the parish neighborhood of Santa María la Blanca, within the old aljama or Jewish quarter of Seville. The father, possibly owing to family influences, obtained in 1536 the job of almoxarife mayor (chief tax official and treasurer) for the city and its ports. The Cetina family's comfortable position allowed them to own slaves (some of them Indian) and to realize the construction of a family tomb in the Dominican convent of Madre de Dios de la Piedad, in which would also be laid the remains of doña Juana de Zúñiga and doña Catalina Cortés, wife and daughter of Hernán Cortés, respectively; as well as the great-granddaughters of Christopher Columbus.

In 1535 occurred the immigration to New Spain of the siblings: Andrea Cetina, Beltrán Cetina, and García del Castillo, accompanied by their aunt, Antonia del Castillo (wife of Gonzalo López, another notable Sevillian, who five years before had participated in Nuño de Guzmán's campaign to conquer the lands that later would become Nueva Galicia).

== The lives of Andrea, Beltrán, Gregorio, and Gutierre de Cetina ==
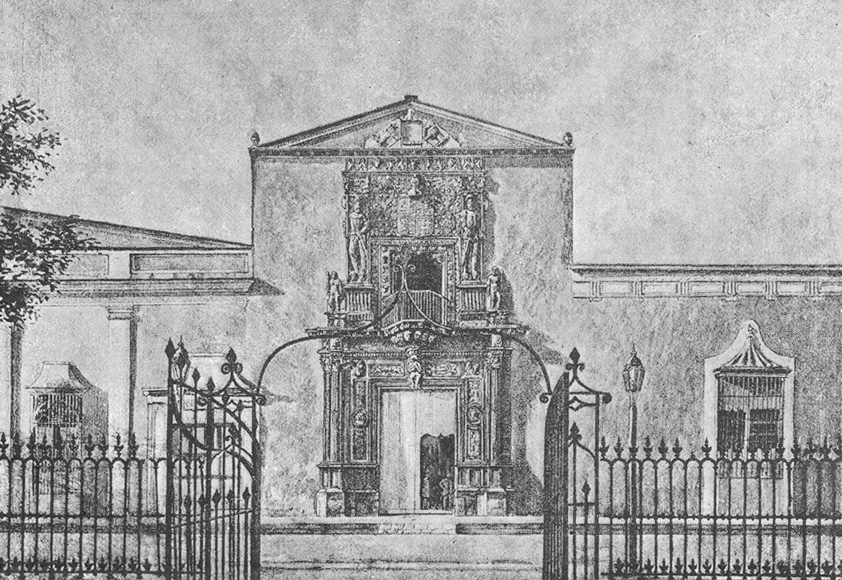
A 19th-century print of the Casa de Montejo, famous for its elaborate plateresque facade, home of Francisco de Montejo y León and Andrea del Castillo and later their descendants

In 1539 Andrea del Castillo married Francisco de Montejo y León; the couple would eventually help found and settle the city of Mérida. The marriage produced three children: Beatriz de Montejo (born ca. 1543), Juan de Montejo (born ca. 1544), and Francisca del Castillo (born. ca. 1545). Although the union is mentioned in passing by Bishop de Landa (who knew the family personally) in his Relación (ca. 1566), it is Fray Diego López de Cogolludo who relates in his Historia de Yucatán (1688) that Montejo y León died insolvent, bequeathing to his son Juan the encumbrance of paying his significant remaining debts, and causing his widow to petition the King of Spain, with both unusual assertiveness and effectiveness, for a pension and the right of retaining ownership of the complex of properties (solares) on the plaza mayor of Mérida (part of which, the Casa de Montejo, would continue to be lived in by her descendants into the 19th-century).

In 1541 Beltrán de Cetina y del Castillo was named by his brother-in-law, Montejo "the Younger", as his civil and military lieutenant (capitán y justicia mayor) in the garrison of San Francisco de Campeche. The following January the city of Mérida was founded, inscribed in the roster of first citizens (vecinos) appears the name of the aforementioned Beltrán de Zetina (sic). Beltrán's role as a conquistador is documented in the list of men who conquered the Yucatán with Montejo compiled by chronicler Baltasar Dorantes de Carranza, son of Andrés Dorantes, survivor of the fateful Narváez expedition.

In 1547 this same Beltrán was made, along with other close associates, a regidor or city councilman by the adelantado Francisco de Montejo y Álvarez de Tejeda. The following year his father (his mother already having died) named in his testamento or will as his principal heirs his eight children (all were legitimate, though some did not opt to use the paternal surname): Gutierre de Cetina, García del Castillo, Beltrán de Cetina, Gregorio de Cetina, Mencía de Santo Domingo Alcocer, Leonor de Cetina, María del Castillo, and Ana Andrea del Castillo.

In 1550 Gregorio de Cetina obtained permission to travel to New Spain, along with his cousins Pedro and Diego López, in order to help in the administration of the properties of his uncle, Gonzalo López. The latter, who had attained the rank of maestre de campo during Cortés's Conquest of Mexico, had previously been accompanied by the eldest of the brothers, Gutierre, during a trip to New Spain in 1546, realized for the purposes of serving as procurador general (procurator general) of the colony.

In 1553, sons of former Mérida regidor Beltrán de Cetina and his Sevillian wife Isabel de Velasco, Beltrán and Gregorio de Cetina y Velasco (there was also another, more obscure, brother named Antonio), traveled to New Spain on a ship captained by Juan de Andino, to live as encomenderos, ultimately leaving multiple descendants in Yucatán, Tabasco, Campeche, and places further afield.

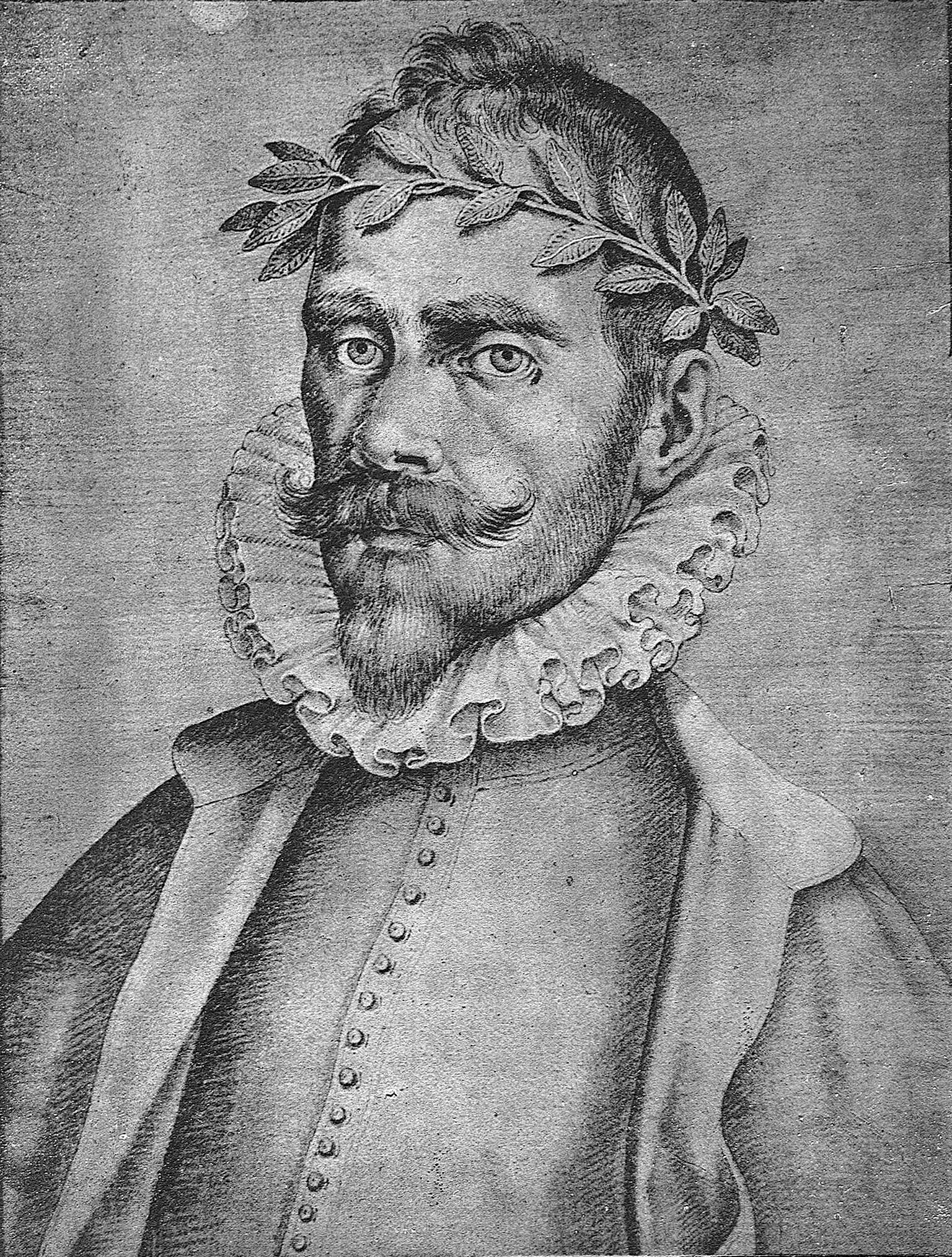
Portrait of Gutierre de Cetina included in the Libro de descripción de...Retratos de Ilustres...

In 1554, Gutierre returned to Mexico only to die in Villa del Espíritu Santo as a result of an infected facial-wound received on April 1 of that year while residing in Puebla, and which was inflicted by the volatile son of one of Panfilo de Narváez's followers, Hernando de Nava, who mistook the poet for Francisco de Peralta, rival for the favors and amours of Leonor de Osma, a lady married to the notable and elderly physician Pedro de la Torre. A portrait, purported to be a true likeness of Gutierre, accompanied by a biographical sketch, is included by painter and poet Francisco Pacheco in his 1599 Libro de descripción de verdaderos Retratos de Ilustres y memorables varones (Book of the Description of the True Portraits of Illustrious and Memorable Men).

García del Castillo, having married Catalina López de Olivares, daughter of the notable Sevillian judge Juan de Olivares and his wife Beatriz López, settled in the City of Mexico; numbering among his children the bachiller and presbyter cleric (clérigo presbítero) Beltrán de Cetina (born ca. 1558), a graduate of the Royal and Pontifical University of Mexico. María del Castillo (the third sibling so surnamed) married influential conquistador Francisco Tamayo de Pacheco and settled in Mérida.

Gregorio de Zetina y del Castillo, having settled in Mérida, married Mariana (or María) de Quijada y Contreras, niece of Diego de Quijada, alcalde mayor of Yucatán from 1561 to 1565, and daughter of Cristóbal Gutiérrez (a conquistador and settler of Chiapas) and Ana de Contreras; their numerous children were Francisca del Castillo, Beltrán de Cetina, Gregorio de Cetina, Diego Quijada, Juan Quijada, Gutierre de Cetina, Hernando de Porras, Gabriel de Cetina, Cristóbal Quijada, and Andrés del Castillo (the surnaming custom was not necessarily linear). Gregorio de Cetina was for a time steward of the chapel of San Juan Bautista, in Mérida, position from which he profited financially. Many of the brothers, their relatives and dependants, left record of their migratory movements in the Casa de Contratación de Indias of Seville. The Cetinas were related by blood or marriage to the Montejos, the Pachecos, the Ortizes de San Pedro, the Rozas, among others, all of whom are counted as being among the first colonizers of Mexico and other lands.

== See also ==
- Conquest of Mexico
- Inés de Suárez
- Spanish conquest of Yucatán
