= Manuel de Mederos =

Portuguese explorer and settler

- Born: 1539; São Miguel Island, Kingdom of Portugal
- Died: 1613 (aged 73–74)
- Occupation(s): Explorer, government official
- Title: Mayor of Monterrey
- Term: 1601, 1605
- Spouse: Magdalena Martínez

Manuel de Mederos (1539–1613) was a Portuguese conquistador, explorer and settler who was active in the Spanish conquest of Mexico. He was one of the founders of the city of Saltillo, Coahuila and was the mayor of Monterrey.

== Early life and family ==
Manuel Mederos's parents were Hernán Rodríguez Medero and Maria Manuela de Amona. He was born in 1539 on São Miguel Island, in the Azores. He moved to Spain in his youth. He arrived in New Spain in 1562. He was part of the expedition of Luis Carvajal y de la Cueva during the conquest of northern Mexico and was one of the original founders of the city of Saltillo, Coahuila, on July 25, 1577. He married Magdalena Martínez.

== Later life ==
Captain de Mederos's hacienda was located south of the Villa of Saltillo, next to the properties of Alberto del Canto and Juan Alonso, close to Buenavista. He was a companion of Don Gaspar Castaño de Sosa in his frustrated voyage to New Mexico.

In 1583 Captain de Mederos was granted a territory in which he established the Hacienda of San Juan Bautista de la Pesquería Grande, which later become the municipality of Garcia in the Mexican state of Nuevo León.

He also joined Carvajal in the founding of the city of Almadén (now Monclova) in April 1588.

In 1593 he returned with his family to Saltillo. In 1599 he moved once again to the city of Monterrey where he occupied various positions: first as town councillor; then in 1601 as mayor; in 1602 as church steward; 1603, town councillor again; and in 1605 again as mayor.

On July 25, 1606, Mederos associated with Diego de Huelva and José de Treviño to cultivate corn and wheat. The next year they bought from the priest, Cebrián de Acevedo Ovalle all of his mines in el Nuevo Reino de León.

On April 22, 1613, he donated land in Santa Catarina to his goddaughter Andrea Rodríguez, wife of Blas Pérez.

He was known to be alive as of December 1613. After this, little is known about Captain Mederos. The Universidad Autónoma de Nuevo León (UANL) has a campus named after him, and there is a Capitán Mederos Avenue in the city of Monterrey.
