= Torrijo de la Cañada =

Torrijo de la Cañada, Spain
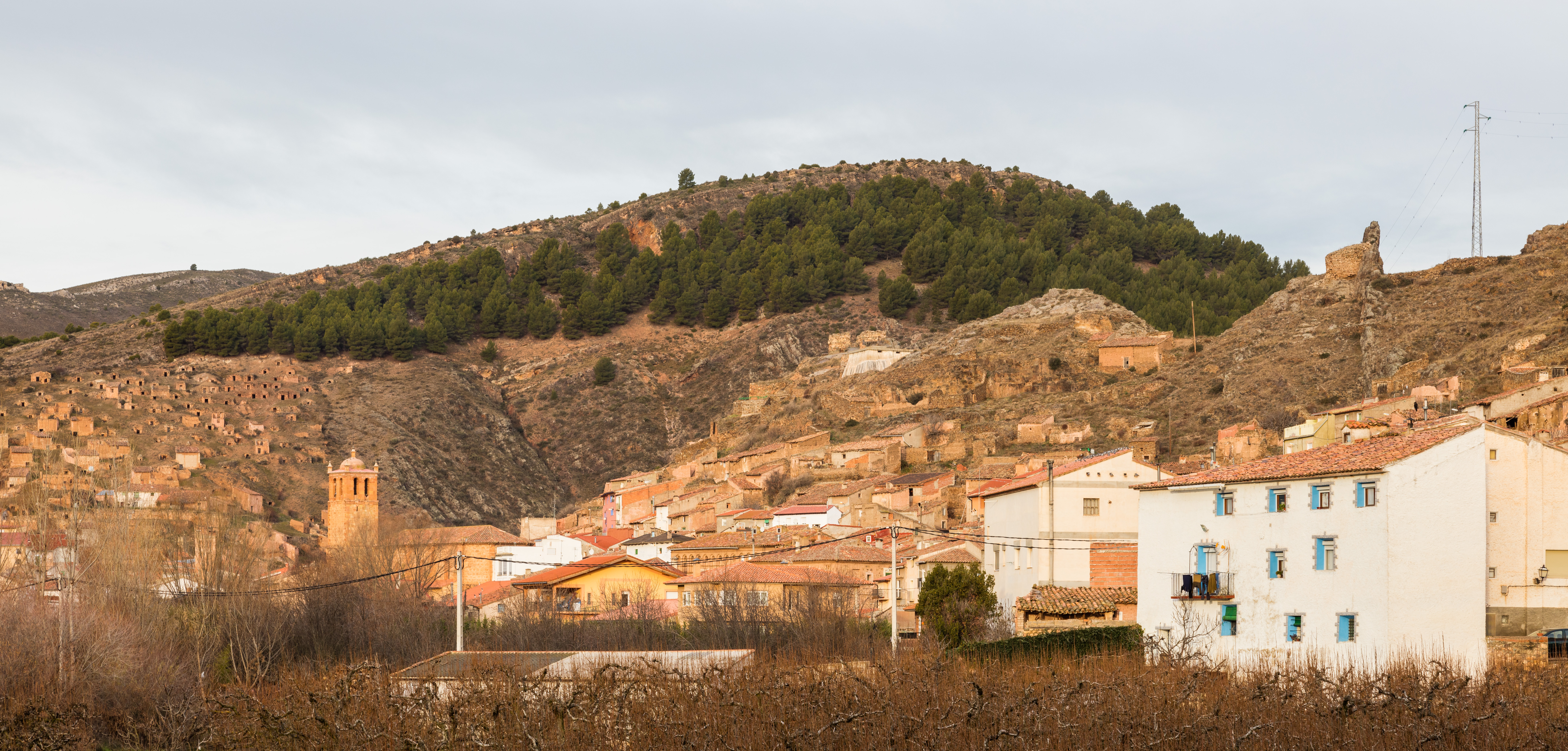
- Torrijo de la Cañada

- Flag Coat of arms

- Location within Spain
- Coordinates: 41°28′N 1°52′W
- Country: Spain
- Autonomous community: Aragon
- Province: Zaragoza
- Municipality: Torrijo de la Cañada

Area
  - Total: 74 km^{2} (29 sq mi)

Population (2025-01-01)
  - Total: 187
  - Density: 2.5/km^{2} (6.5/sq mi)
- Time zone: UTC+1 (CET)
  - Summer (DST): UTC+2 (CEST)

Torrijo de la Cañada is a municipality located in the province of Zaragoza, Aragon, Spain. According to the 2004 census (INE), the municipality has a population of 337 inhabitants.

== See also ==
- List of municipalities in Zaragoza
