= List of conflicts in South America =

This is a list of armed conflicts in South America.

Development of Spanish America Government under traditional Spanish law Loyal to Supreme Centre Cortes American junta or insurrection movement Independent state declared or established Height of French control of the Peninsula

== Argentina ==
- c. 1472–1493 Topa Inca Yupanqui, the tenth Sapa Inca of the Inca Empire, extended the realm northward along the Andes through modern Ecuador, and developed a special fondness for the city of Quito, which he rebuilt with architects from Cuzco. During this time his father Pachacuti reorganized the Kingdom of Cuzco into the Tahuantinsuyu, the "four provinces". He led extensive military conquests to extend the Inca Empire across much of South America, within the boundaries of the nations which are today called Peru, Bolivia, Chile, and Argentina. He became Inca in his turn upon his father's death in 1471, ruling until his own death in 1493. He conquered Chimor, which occupied the northern coast of what is now Peru, the largest remaining rival to the Incas.
- c. 1493–1527 Huayna Capac, the eleventh Sapa Inca of the Inca Empire, extended the Inca Empire significantly to the south into present-day Chile and Argentina and tried to annex territories towards the north, in what is now Ecuador and southern Colombia, founding cities like Atuntaqui. Further north, Huayna Capac's forces reached the Chinchipe River Basin but were pushed back by the Shuar in 1527. The Inca Empire reached the height of its size and power under his rule, stretching over much of present-day Bolivia, Peru, Argentina, Chile, Ecuador and southwestern Colombia. The lands conquered in the south within Bolivia, Argentina, and Chile would form the province Qullasuyu of the Inca Empire.
- 1560 — 1667 Calchaquí Wars
- 1754 — 1757 Spanish-Portuguese invasion of the Jesuit-sponsored "Guarani Nation"
- 1770 Capture of Port Egmont
- 1806 — 1807 British invasions of the River Plate
- 1810 — 1818 Argentine War of Independence
- 1811 — 1812 Portuguese invasion of the Banda Oriental (1811–1812)
- 1814 — 1880 Argentine Civil Wars
- 1816 — 1820 Portuguese conquest of the Banda Oriental
- 1821 — 1823 War of Independence of Maynas
- 1825 — 1828 Cisplatine War
- 1825 — 1889 Tarija dispute
- 1831 — 1832 Falklands Expedition
- 1832 — 1833 Reassertion of British sovereignty over the Falkland Islands (1833)
- 1837 — 1839 War between Argentina and Peru–Bolivian Confederation
- 1838 — 1840 French blockade of the Río de la Plata
- 1839 — 1851 Uruguayan Civil War
- 1844 — 1845 USS Congress incident
- 1845 — 1850 Anglo-French blockade of the Río de la Plata
- 1851 — 1852 Platine War
- 1864 — 1870 Paraguayan War
- 1870s — 1884 Conquest of the Desert
- 1890 Revolution of the Park
- 1893 Argentine Revolution of 1893
- 1894 — 1904 Beagle conflict
- 1905 Argentine Revolution of 1905
- 1920 — 1922 Patagonia Rebelde
- 1930 1930 Argentine coup d'état
- 1943 1943 Argentine coup d'état
- 1955 Revolución Libertadora
- 1958 Snipe incident
- 1963 1963 Argentine Navy revolt
- 1965 Laguna del Desierto incident
- 1966 Argentine Revolution
- 1966 Aerolíneas Argentinas Flight 648
- 1976 — 1983 The Dirty War
  - 1975-1977 Operativo Independencia
    - 1975 Battle of Acheral
  - 1975 Operation Primicia
  - 1976 1976 Argentine coup d'état
- 1977 — 1978 Direct negotiations between Chile and Argentina in 1977–1978
- 1982 — The Falklands War
- 1987 — 1990 Carapintadas uprisings
- 1989 — Attack on La Tablada barracks
- 1997 — present Mapuche conflict
- 2001 Argentinazo
- 2013 police revolts in Argentina

== Bolivia ==
- c. 500 — c. 1100 Wari Empire
- c. 1472–1493 Topa Inca Yupanqui, the tenth Sapa Inca of the Inca Empire, extended the realm northward along the Andes through modern Ecuador, and developed a special fondness for the city of Quito, which he rebuilt with architects from Cuzco. During this time his father Pachacuti reorganized the Kingdom of Cuzco into the Tahuantinsuyu, the "four provinces". He led extensive military conquests to extend the Inca Empire across much of South America, within the boundaries of the nations which are today called Peru, Bolivia, Chile, and Argentina. He became Inca in his turn upon his father's death in 1471, ruling until his own death in 1493. He conquered Chimor, which occupied the northern coast of what is now Peru, the largest remaining rival to the Incas. The lands conquered in the south within Bolivia, Argentina, and Chile would form the province Qullasuyu of the Inca Empire.
- 1780 — 1782 Rebellion of Túpac Amaru II by indigenous people, mestizos, blacks, and criollos against the Spanish Empire
- 1809 — 1825 Bolivian War of Independence
- 1825 Invasion of Chiquitos
- 1828 Peruvian-Bolivian War of 1828
- 1835 — 1836 Salaverry-Santa Cruz War
- 1836 — 1839 War of the Confederation between the Peru-Bolivian Confederation and Chile
- 1837 — 1839 Tarija War
- 1841 — 1842 Peruvian-Bolivian War of 1841-42
- 1865 — 1871 Chincha Islands War
- 1879 — 1884 Bolivia and Peru fight Chile in the War of the Pacific
- 1892 Chiriguano War
- 1898 — 1899 Bolivian Civil War
- 1899 — 1903 Acre War
- 1910 Campaign of the Manuripi region
- 1932 — 1935 Chaco War between Bolivia and Paraguay
- 1946 La Paz riots
- 1952 Bolivian National Revolution
- 1966 — 1967 Ñancahuazú Guerrilla
- 1970 Teoponte Guerrilla
- 2008 unrest in Bolivia
- 2011 — 2012 Bolivian Indigenous Rights Protests
- 2019 Bolivian protests
- 2020 Bolivian protests

== Brazil ==
- 1534 — 1536 Iguape War
- 1554 — 1567 War of the Tamoio Confederation
- 1557 — 1575 French-Portuguese conflict over France Antarctique, a French colony in Rio de Janeiro.
- 1591 — Thomas Cavendish, a British corsair, occupied Santos
- 1595 Capture of Recife (1595)
- 1617 — 1621 Tupinambás Uprising
- 1624 — 1654 Dutch invasions of Brazil
- 1641 Acclamation of Amador Bueno
- 1666 Conjuration of Our Father
- 1682 — 1713 Confederation of the Cariris
- 1707 — 1709 War of the Emboabas
- 1710 — 1711 War of the Mascates
- 1712 — 1719 Mandu Ladino Revolt
- 1720 Vila Rica Revolt
- 1723 Cabinda Expedition
- 1735 — 1737 Spanish-Portuguese War (1735-1737)
- 1754 — 1756 Guaraní War
- 1762 — 1763 Fantastic War
- 1776 — 1777 Spanish-Portuguese War (1776-1777)
- 1789 Inconfidência Mineira
- 1798 1798 Revolt of the Alfaiates
- 1800 — 1801 Conspiracy of Suassuna
- 1801 War of the Oranges
- 1809 Portuguese conquest of French Guiana
- 1816 — 1820 Portuguese conquest of the Banda Oriental
- 1817 Pernambucan revolution
- 1822 — 1825 Brazilian War of Independence
- 1824 Confederation of the Equator
- 1825 — 1828 Cisplatine War
- 1832 Guanais Federation
- 1832 — 1835 Cabanada
- 1835 — Malê Revolt
- 1835 — 1840 Cabanagem
- 1835 — 1845 Republican revolt against the Empire of Brazil is put down in the Ragamuffin War
- 1837 — 1838 Sabinada
- 1838 Manuel Congo rebellion
- 1838 — 1841 Balaiada
- 1842 Liberal rebellions of 1842
- 1848 — 1849 Praieira revolt
- 1856 — 1857 Ibicaba Revolt
- 1862 — 1865 Christie Question
- 1864 Bahia incident
- 1864 — 1870 Paraguayan War
- 1866 — 1906 Alto Uruguay Flotilla
- 1874 — 1875 Quebra-Quilos revolt
- 1874 Revolt of the Muckers
- 1886 — 1891 First Cunani conflict
- 1889 Proclamation of the Republic (Brazil)
- 1896 — 1897 War of Canudos
- 1912 — 1916 Contestado War, a rebellion in Brazil, fails.
- 1932 — 1932 Constitutionalist Revolution, a failed uprising centered in São Paulo, Brazil
- 1961 — 1963 Lobster War
- 1964 1964 Brazilian coup d'état
- 1966 — 1975 Araguaia Guerrilla War
- February 1991 — March 1991 Operation Traira
- 1990 – present Armed conflict for control of the favelas
  - 2006 2006 São Paulo violence outbreak
  - 2010 2010 Rio de Janeiro security crisis

== Chile ==
- c. 500 — c. 1100 Wari Empire
- c. 1472–1493 Topa Inca Yupanqui, the tenth Sapa Inca of the Inca Empire, extended the realm northward along the Andes through modern Ecuador, and developed a special fondness for the city of Quito, which he rebuilt with architects from Cuzco. During this time his father Pachacuti reorganized the Kingdom of Cuzco into the Tahuantinsuyu, the "four provinces". He led extensive military conquests to extend the Inca Empire across much of South America, within the boundaries of the nations which are today called Peru, Bolivia, Chile, and Argentina. He became Inca in his turn upon his father's death in 1471, ruling until his own death in 1493. He conquered Chimor, which occupied the northern coast of what is now Peru, the largest remaining rival to the Incas.
- c. 1493–1527 Huayna Capac, the eleventh Sapa Inca of the Inca Empire, extended the Inca Empire significantly to the south into present-day Chile and Argentina and tried to annex territories towards the north, in what is now Ecuador and southern Colombia, founding cities like Atuntaqui. Further north, Huayna Capac's forces reached the Chinchipe River Basin but were pushed back by the Shuar in 1527. The Inca Empire reached the height of its size and power under his rule, stretching over much of present-day Bolivia, Peru, Argentina, Chile, Ecuador and southwestern Colombia. The lands conquered in the south within Bolivia, Argentina, and Chile would form the province Qullasuyu of the Inca Empire.
- 1535 — 1537 Expedition to Chile of the Spanish conqueror Diego de Almagro.

- 1536 Battle of Reynogüelén

- 16th century — 17th or 18th century Arauco War

- 1546 Battle of Quilacura
- 1550 Battle of Andalien
- 1550 Battle of Penco
- 1553 Battle of Tucapel
- 1554 Battle of Marihueñu
- 1556 Battle of Peteroa
- 1557 Battle of Mataquito
- 1557 Battle of Lagunillas
- 1557 Battle of Millarapue
- 1558 Battle of Quiapo
- 1564 Siege of Concepcion
- 1564 Battle of Angol
- 1569 Battle of Catirai
- 1598 Disaster of Curalaba
- 1599 — 1604 Destruction of the Seven Cities
- 1612 Defensive War
- 1655 Mapuche Insurrection
- 1712 Huilliche rebellion
- 1723 The Mapuche Uprising
- 1759, 1766, and 1769 The Mapuche Rebellions
- 1792 Huilliche Rebellion of 1792

- 1810 — 1826 Chilean War of Independence
- 1829 — 1830 Chilean Civil War
- 1836 — 1839 War of the Confederation between the Peru-Bolivian Confederation and Chile
- 1851 Chilean Revolution
- 1861 — 1883 Occupation of Araucanía
- 1864 — 1866 The Chincha Islands War between Spain and former colonies Peru and Chile occurs
- 1879 — 1884 Bolivia and Peru fight Chile in the War of the Pacific
- 1891 1891 Chilean Civil War
- 1973 Tanquetazo
- 1973 1973 Chilean coup d'etat
- 1973 — 1990 Armed resistance in Chile (1973–1990)
- 1997 — present Mapuche conflict
- 2019 — 2021 2019–2021 Chilean protests

== Colombia ==
- c. 1493–1527 Huayna Capac, the eleventh Sapa Inca of the Inca Empire, extended the Inca Empire significantly to the south into present-day Chile and Argentina and tried to annex territories towards the north, in what is now Ecuador and southern Colombia, founding cities like Atuntaqui. Further north, Huayna Capac's forces reached the Chinchipe River Basin but were pushed back by the Shuar in 1527. The Inca Empire reached the height of its size and power under his rule, stretching over much of present-day Bolivia, Peru, Argentina, Chile, Ecuador and southwestern Colombia. The lands conquered in the north within Peru, Ecuador, and Colombia would form the province Chinchay Suyu of the Inca Empire.
- 1470 – 1490 Muisca warfare
- 1499 – 1602 Spanish conquest of the Chibchan Nations
- 1537 – 1539 Spanish conquest of the Muisca
- 1828 – 1829 Gran Colombia–Peru War
- 1860 – 1862 Colombian Civil War
- 1899 – 1902 Colombian Thousand Days' War
- 1932 – 1933 Colombia–Peru War
- 1948 – 1958 La Violencia in Colombia.
- 1964 – present Colombian conflict.
  - 1980 1980 Dominican Republic Embassy siege in Bogotá
  - 1985 Palace of Justice siege
  - 2004 – 2006 Operation JM
  - 2008 Operation Jaque
  - 2013 2013 Colombian clashes
  - 2018 Catatumbo campaign
- 2013 2013 Colombian coffee growers strike
- 2019 – 2020 2019–2020 Colombian protests
- 2021 – present 2021 Colombian protests

== Ecuador ==
- c. 1471–1493 Topa Inca Yupanqui, the tenth Sapa Inca of the Inca Empire, extended the realm northward along the Andes through modern Ecuador, and developed a special fondness for the city of Quito, and conquered Chimor
- c. 1493–1527 Huayna Capac, the eleventh Sapa Inca of the Inca Empire, extended the Inca Empire significantly to the south into present-day Chile and Argentina and tried to annex territories towards the north, in what is now Ecuador and southern Colombia, founding cities like Atuntaqui. Further north, Huayna Capac's forces reached the Chinchipe River Basin but were pushed back by the Shuar in 1527. The Inca Empire reached the height of its size and power under his rule, stretching over much of present-day Bolivia, Peru, Argentina, Chile, Ecuador and southwestern Colombia. The lands conquered in the north within Peru, Ecuador, and Colombia would form the province Chinchay Suyu of the Inca Empire.
- 1809 — 1812 Quito Revolution (1809–1812)
- 1820 — 1822 Ecuadorian War of Independence
- 1911 — 1912 War of the Generals
- 1913 — 1916 Ecuadorian Civil War of 1913–1916
- 1941 Ecuadorian-Peruvian War
- 1981 Paquisha War
- 1995 Cenepa War
- 2012 Ecuadorian protests
- 2015 Ecuadorian protests
- 2018 — present War on drugs in Ecuador
  - 2020 — present Ecuadorian security crisis
  - 2024 — present 2024 Ecuadorian conflict
- 2019 Ecuadorian protests
- 2020 Ecuadorian protests

== French Guiana ==
- 1667 Capture of Cayenne
- 1809 — 1817 Portuguese conquest and occupation of French Guiana
- 1895 Amapá Question
- 2017 social unrest in French Guiana

== Peru ==
- c. 900 BCE — c. 200 BCE Chavín culture

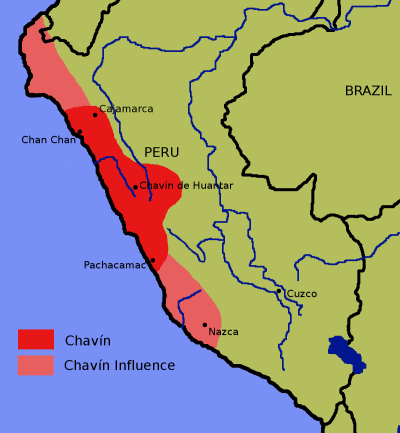
The area of the Chavín culture, as well as areas the Chavín culture influenced.

- c. 500 — c. 1100 CE Wari Empire

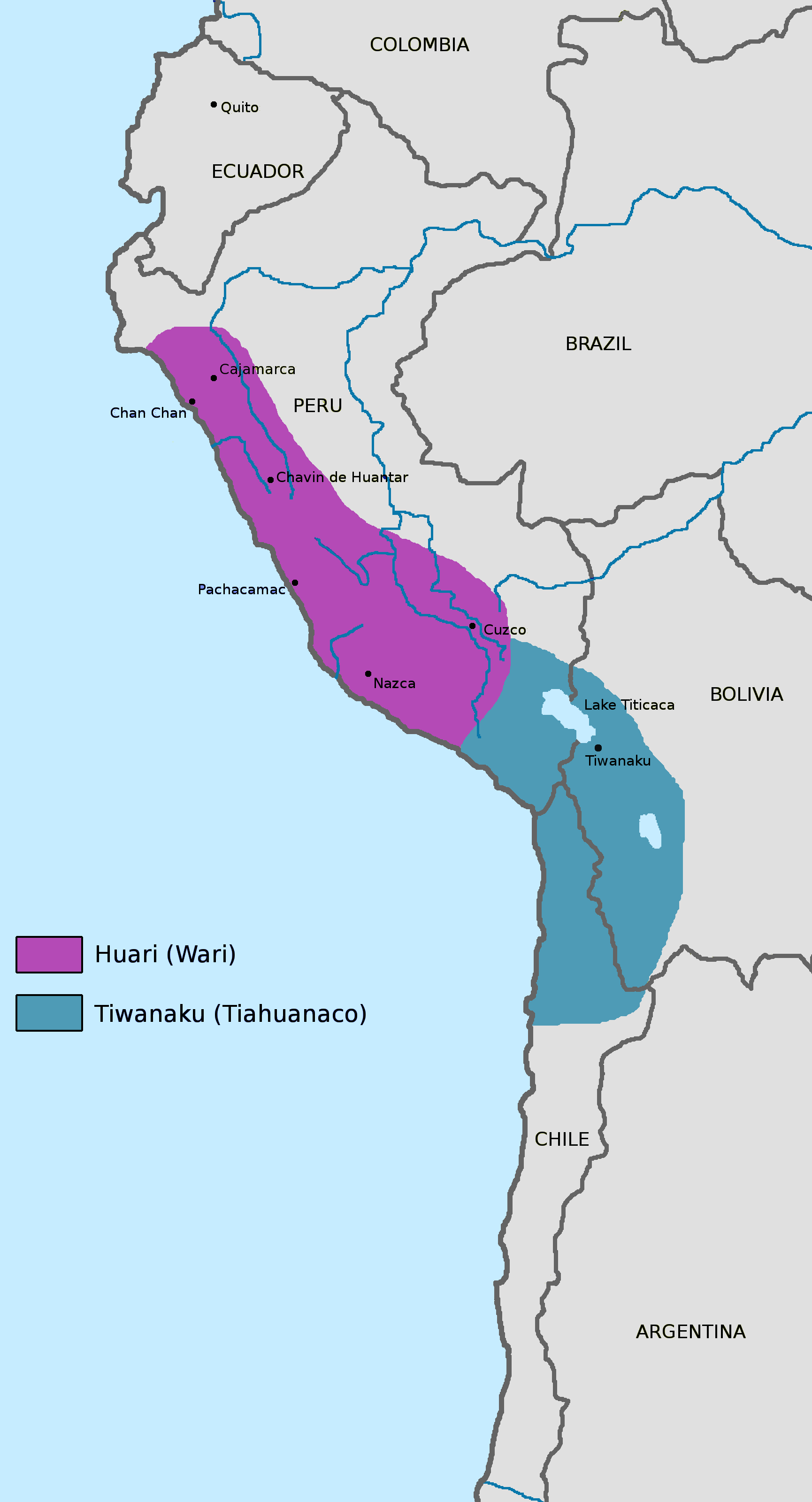
A map of the extent of the Wari Empire

- c. 1230 Sinchi Roca, the second Sapa Inca of the Kingdom of Cuzco, waged war against a nearby kingdom after the killing of the Inca diplomat Teuotihi
- c. 1290 Mayta Cápac, the fourth Sapa Inca of the Kingdom of Cuzco, put the regions of Arequipa and Moquegua under the control of the Inca empire
- c. 1320 Cápac Yupanqui, the fifth Sapa Inca of the Kingdom of Cuzco, was the first Inca to conquer territory outside the valley of Cuzco
- c. 1350 — c. 1380 Inca Roca, the sixth Sapa Inca of the Kingdom of Cuzco, is said to have conquered the Chancas
- c. 1380 Yáhuar Huácac, the seventh Sapa Inca of the Kingdom of Cuzco, abandoned the capital in an attack by the Chancas
- c. 1410 — c. 1438 Viracocha Inca, the eighth Sapa Inca of the Kingdom of Cuzco, defended the capital against the attack by the Chancas
- c. 1438 — c. 1472 Pachacuti, the ninth Sapa Inca of the Kingdom of Cuzco, defeated the Chancas and the Chimú

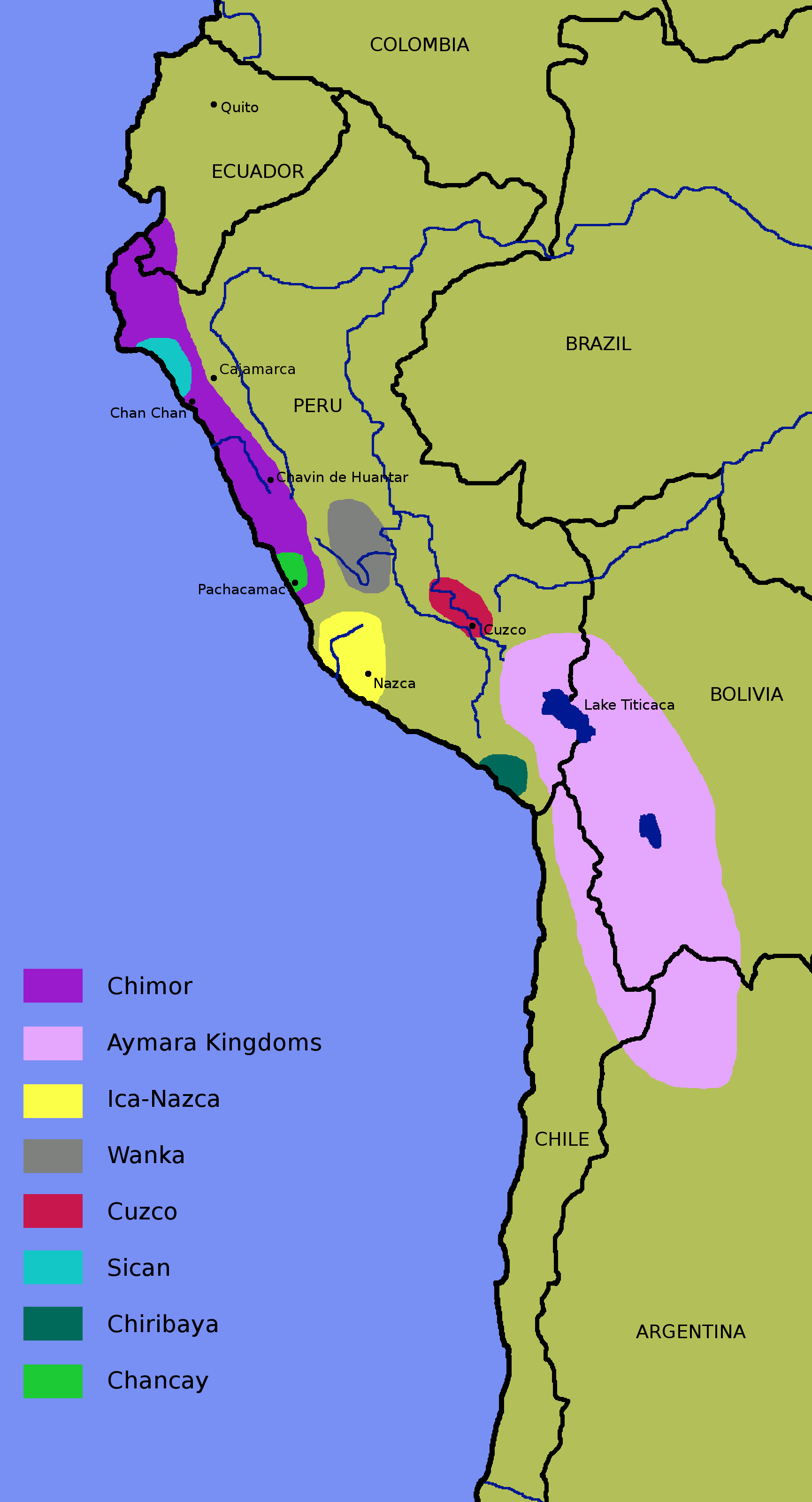
A map of the extent of the Kingdom of Cuzco in 1438

- c. 1472 — c. 1493 Topa Inca Yupanqui, the tenth Sapa Inca of the Inca Empire, extended the realm northward along the Andes through modern Ecuador, and developed a special fondness for the city of Quito, which he rebuilt with architects from Cuzco. During this time his father Pachacuti reorganized the Kingdom of Cuzco into the Tahuantinsuyu, the "four provinces". He led extensive military conquests to extend the Inca Empire across much of South America, within the boundaries of the nations which are today called Peru, Bolivia, Chile, and Argentina. He became Inca in his turn upon his father's death in 1471, ruling until his own death in 1493. He conquered Chimor, which occupied the northern coast of what is now Peru, the largest remaining rival to the Incas.
- c. 1493 — c. 1527 Huayna Capac, the eleventh Sapa Inca of the Inca Empire, extended the Inca Empire significantly to the south into present-day Chile and Argentina and tried to annex territories towards the north, in what is now Ecuador and southern Colombia, founding cities like Atuntaqui. Further north, Huayna Capac's forces reached the Chinchipe River Basin but were pushed back by the Shuar in 1527. The Inca Empire reached the height of its size and power under his rule, stretching over much of present-day Bolivia, Peru, Argentina, Chile, Ecuador and southwestern Colombia.

A map of the Inca Empire at its greatest extent

- c. 1529 — c. 1532 Inca Civil War

- 1529 Battle of Chillopampa
- 1531 Battle of Mullihambato
- 1531 Battle of Chimborazo War between Atahualpa and Huascar.
- 1532 Battle of Huanucopampa
- 1532 Battle of Quipaipan

- 1525 — 1572 Spanish conquest of the Inca Empire

- 1525 Battle of Punta Quemada
- 1531 Battle of Puná
- 1532 Battle of Cajamarca
- 1533 Battle of Vilcaconga
- 1533 Battle of Cuzco
- 1534 Battle of Maraycalla
- 1534 Battle of Mount Chimborazo
- 1536 Siege of Cuzco
- 1537 Battle of Ollantaytambo
- 1537 Battle of Abancay
- 1538 Battle of Las Salinas
- 1542 Battle of Chupas
- 1546 Battle of Añaquito
- 1547 Battle of Huarina
- 1548 Battle of Jaquijahuana
- 1572 Final war with Spain

- 1780 — 1782 Rebellion of Túpac Amaru II
- 1812 — 1821 Peruvian War of Independence
- 1821 — 1998 Ecuadorian–Peruvian territorial dispute
- 1836 — 1839 War of the Confederation
- 1837 — 1839 War between Argentina and Peru–Bolivian Confederation
- 1879 — 1884 War of the Pacific
- 1932 — 1933 Leticia Incident with Colombia.
- 1941 — 1942 Ecuadorian–Peruvian War
- 1968 1968 Peruvian coup d'état
- 1981 — Paquisha War.
- 1980 — Internal conflict in Peru
  - 1982 Assault of Ayacucho prison
  - 1992 1992 Peruvian coup d'état
  - 1997 Operation Chavín de Huántar
  - 2016 Hatun Asha ambush
- 1995 Cenepa war
- 2009 2009 Peruvian political crisis
- 2015 2015 Peruvian protests against Las Bambas mining project
- 2017 — present 2017–present Peruvian political crisis
  - 2018 2018 Peruvian agrarian strike
  - 2019 — 2020 2019–2020 Peruvian constitutional crisis
  - 2020 2020 Peruvian protests
  - 2020 — 2021 2020–2021 Peruvian agrarian strike
  - 2022 2022 Peruvian protests

== Paraguay ==
- 1864 — 1870 War Of The Triple Alliance
- 1911 — 1912 Paraguayan Civil War (1911–1912)
- 1922 — 1923 Paraguayan Civil War (1922–1923)
- 1932 — 1935 Chaco War
- 1947 — Paraguayan Civil War (1947)
- 1954 1954 Paraguayan coup d'état
- 1989 1989 Paraguayan coup d'état
- 1996 1996 Paraguayan coup d'état attempt
- 1999 Marzo paraguayo
- 2000 2000 Paraguayan coup d'état attempt
- 2005 — present Paraguayan People's Army insurgency
- 2017 2017 Paraguayan crisis
- 2021 2021 Paraguayan protests

== Uruguay ==
- 1820 — 1828 Cisplatine War
- 1839 — 1851 Uruguayan Civil War
- 1851 — 1852 Platine War
- 1864 — 1865 Uruguayan War
- 1865 — 1870 Paraguayan War
- 1870 — 1872 Revolution of the Lances
- 1903 — 1904 Aparicio Saravia revolt
- 1973 — 1985 1973 Uruguayan coup d'état

== Venezuela ==
- 1567 Battle of Maracapana
- 1811 — 1823 Venezuelan War of Independence
- 1859 — 1863 Federal War
- 1908 Dutch-Venezuela War
- 1958 1958 Venezuelan coup d'état
- 1962 El Carupanazo
- 1962 El Porteñazo
- 1967 Machurucuto incident
- 1989 Caracazo
- 1992 1992 Venezuelan coup d'état attempts
- 2002 2002 Venezuelan coup d'état attempt
- 2007 2007 RCTV protests
- 2010 — present Crisis in Venezuela
  - 2013 2013 Venezuelan presidential election protests
  - 2014 — present Venezuelan protests (2014–present)
  - 2017 2017 Venezuelan protests
    - 2017 Mother of All Marches
  - 2017 Attack on Fort Paramacay
  - 2018 El Junquito raid
  - 2018 — present Pemon conflict
  - 2019 — present Venezuelan presidential crisis
    - 2019 2019 Venezuelan uprising attempt
    - 2019 2019 Venezuelan protests
    - 2020 Operation Gideon (2020)
    - 2021 2021 Apure clashes
  - 2026 2026 United States intervention in Venezuela

== Suriname ==
- 1804 Battle of Suriname
- 1980 1980 Surinamese coup d'etat
- 1986 — 1992 Surinamese Interior War
- 1990 1990 Surinamese coup d'état

== Guyana ==
- 1712 Cassard expedition
- 1763 — 1764 Berbice slave uprising
- 1823 Demerara rebellion of 1823
- 1969 Rupununi Uprising

== See also ==
- List of conflicts in North America
- List of conflicts in Central America
- List of conflicts in Europe
- List of conflicts in Africa
- List of conflicts in Asia
- List of conflicts in the Near East
- List of conflicts in the Middle East
- List of wars
- Revolutions of Brazil
