= Pombal, Paraíba =

Coordinates: 7.35778°S 35.8978°W

Pombal
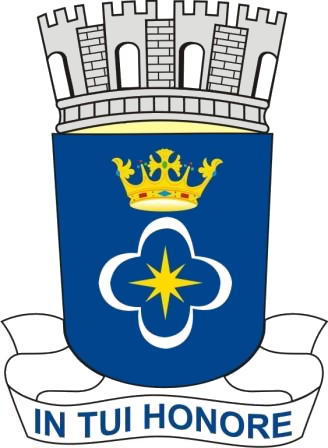
- Flag Coat of arms
- Nickname: Terra de Maringá (Maringá Land)
- Motto: In Tui Honore
- Country: Brazil
- State: Paraíba
- Established: July 21, 1624

Area
  - Total: 894.099 km^{2} (345.214 sq mi)

Population (2020)
  - Total: 32,802

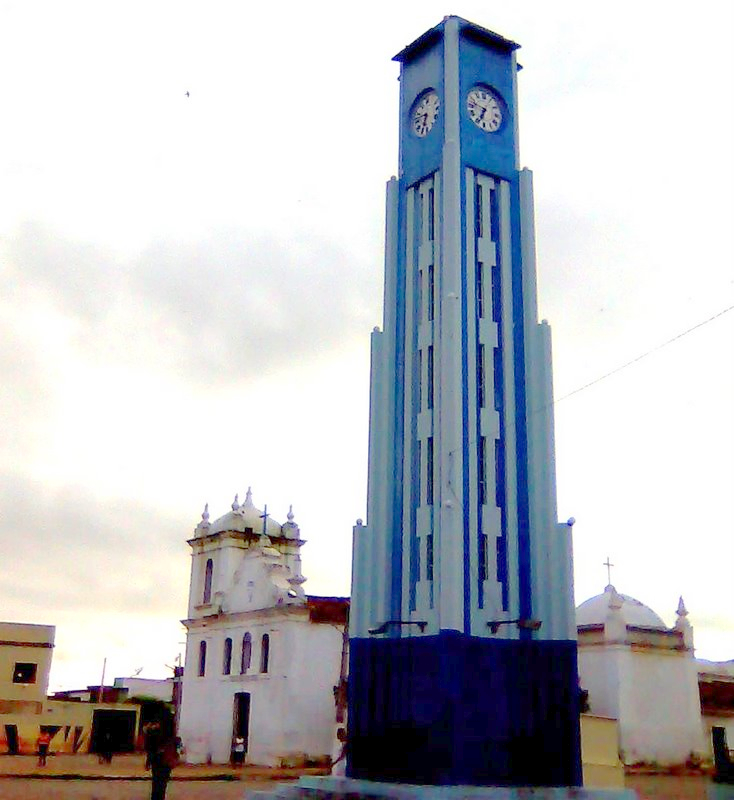
Clock Tower of Pombal City, behind Old Church, downtown Pombal.

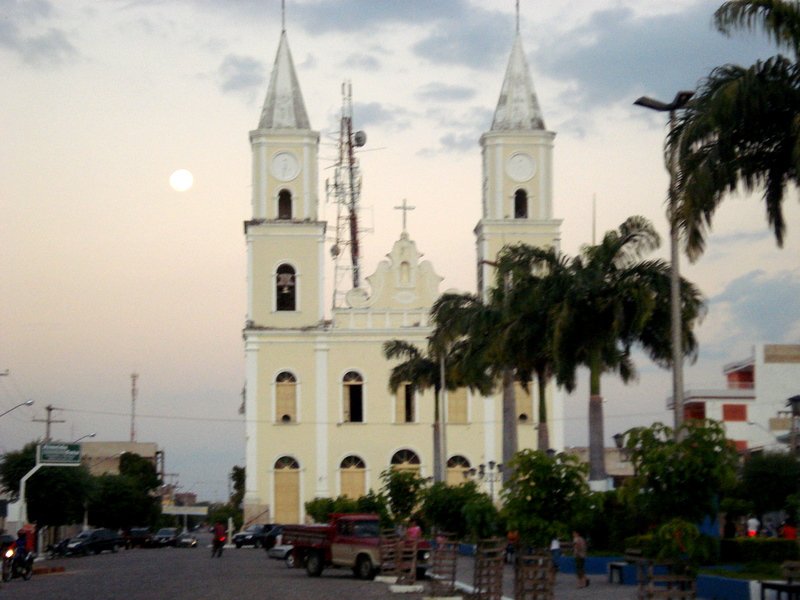
Church in Centennial Square, in downtown.

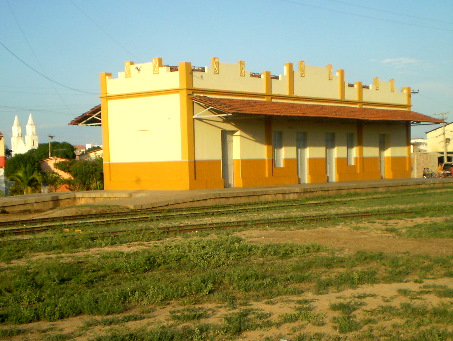
Old Railway Station in the city built in the provisional government of 1932. Reformed the administration of Mayor Pollyanna Feitosa in 2009. For SEMCET (Municipal Department of Culture, Sport and Tourism) to the secretary: Paul Romero Oliveira Freitas.

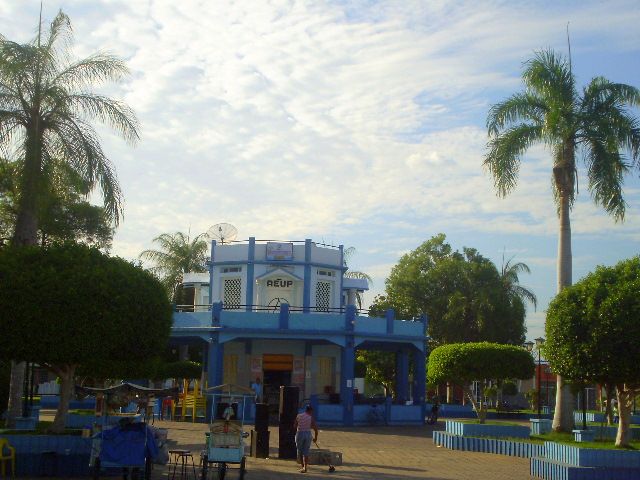
Bar Centennial, and the second floor AEUP (Association of the University of Pombal) in Centennial Square, downtown Pombal.

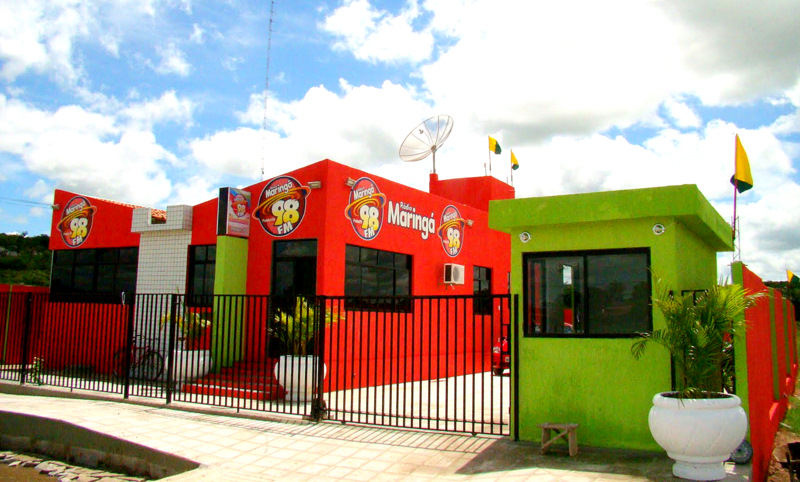
Maringa 98FM radio headquarters in the town of Pombal.

Pombal Portuguese pronunciation: [põˈbaʊ̯] is a Brazilian municipality in the State of Paraíba. Located at an altitude of 184 meters. According to the Brazilian Institute of Geography and Statistics (IBGE), in 2020 it had an estimated population of 32,802 inhabitants. Its territorial area is 894 km^{2}.

== History ==
It was along the rivers that flourished early civilizations of the world, giving a new direction to human history, in turn call river civilizations. And the decisive factor in the colonization of Pombal was the Rio Piancó.

The penetration paraibano was made by agricultural and pastoral purposes.

Right in the late seventeenth century, around 1696, the pioneer Theodosius Canate, after many battles with the natives, reached the location of the landmarks of the founding of Festival of Piranhas, the right bank of the river Piancó.

The interior, hitherto unexplored was occupied by the tribes of the family Cariri - the PEGAS and PANATO.

The city received three names. The first Festival of Piranhas (1696), the last village of Nossa Senhora do Bom Sucesso (1719) and by royal charter of July 22, 1766 was elevated to the category of town with the name of Pombal. Homage to the First Minister of the king of Portugal D. José I, the Marquis of Pombal (Sebastião José de Carvalho e Melo). High category of life came the official installation to 4 May 1772.

The town became a district on October 15, 1827, and July 21, 1862 was granted city outlaws the seat of the municipality is a great brand of Luso-Brazilian ties.

The county of Pombal was established in 1831 and was supplied in 1882 and restored by the State Law No. 330 of November 11, 1898 based on Patos.

Under the State Law No. 330 of 1907 moved the headquarters to the city of Pombal.

The county of Pombal is 2 Sub-division, covering the cities of Lake and São Paulo, Danvers, São Domingos de Pombal and São Bento de Pombal.

Pombal - was the 1st Village high paraibano, and today stands as culturally Fourth (4th) oldest city in Paraíba.

== Annual Festivals and Events ==
Each year the two parties stand in the city, the Pombal Fest, which always occurs in the month of July, commemorating the anniversary of the city, shaped out of season carnival. And the Feast of the Rosary, which occurs in October, when the first weeks of the month, extending up to about October 12, the day of children.

== Geography ==
The city is included in the geographic area covered by the Brazilian semiarid, defined by the Ministry of National Integration in 2005. This distinction is made based precipitation index, the index of aridity and drought risk.

== Monuments and Historic Buildings ==
There are many monuments and historic buildings in the city, like the house of culture, which was the old jail, where torture was no different to blacks and people who disobeyed the law. In the city center can find the Church of Our Lady of Good Success and Our Lady of the Rosary, and there are others just symbolic, as Centenary Square, the Pillar of Time, Cruise, and the Bandstand, where today downstairs is a bar known as "The Centenary Bar", and upstairs is a small club called AEUP (Association of University Students of Pombal). There are other parks, churches and monuments in the city, but these are the ones that attract wide attention.

== University in Pombal ==
Since 2006, the population of Pombal protested the establishment of colleges or universities in the city. Since early 2007 the Federal University of Campina Grande UFCG is acting in the city, was first headquartered in the building of the former School Joshua BEZERRRA. And with the campus opening planned for 2010, CAIC nearby school in the district Pear. Facilities include 18 buildings and a vast land area. According to data, the second largest campus of a university in the state of Paraiba. But with the work already underway by a vast time, In July 2009, during Pombal Fest was the inauguration of the campus, he expected the presence of President Lula, but the same could not attend.

== Radios ==
In the city there are four radio stations, the programming is varied radios Liberdade96fm, Maringá98.7fm, Opção104fm and religious radio programming is Bomsucessoam. In addition to songs from all rhythms, the radios serve as news to major news of the city where the company participates in phone calls making public complaints about abuse, politics, vandalism, corruption and crime. The radios provide full coverage of the city to city events such as Pombal Fest, Feast of the Rosary, plus exclusive interviews with established singers who make presentations in the city in times of festivity. Among the city's radio announcers stand Goddess Fernandes, Nil Alcantara Claudionou Naldo Silva Dantas and the interactivity with the people in their programs.

== Notable residents ==
- Manuel Arruda da Câmara, scientist, physician and botanist
- Leandro Gomes de Barros, a poet of Brazilian cordel literature.
- Carlos Dunga, politician, teacher, farmer and lawyer
- Adauto Pereira, politician, farmer and industrialist
- João da Mata de Souza, politician, lawyer and farmer
- Wallber Virgolino, politician, teacher and civil police officer
- Ademar Pereira, politician and doctor
