= Indian post (Brazil) =

Indian post (índio correio) was the habit in Brazil during the colonization up until the Empire of employing native Brazilians to deliver letters and short messages.

The native Brazilians were employed for several reasons. according to the English traveller Henry Koster, they could walk for a whole month, only stopping to rest for brief periods of time, and they could find their way even when there was no clear road to follow. Thus, the emissary could even surpass a horse, specially on long-distance travels. Also, most native Brazilians couldn't read, thus bettering the odds of keeping the confidentiality of the message.

The habit of employing native Brazilians was common. Most employees of the Correio do Norte do Brasil, created in 1812 during Maximiano Francisco Duarte's term as governor of the Captaincy of Ceará, were native Brazilians. They received wages and help during their travels, but they were also succetible to corporeal punishment for delays and other problems.

According to the poem of Miguel Maria Lisboa, an Indian post was the responsible for delivering the message of the surrender of the Kingdom of Portugal to Dom Pedro I, thus resulting on the Ipiranga's Shout.
