= Mandu Ladino Revolt =

Indigenous Revolt

The Mandu Ladino Revolt was an uprising where several Tupi Indians, led by Mandu Ladino from the Piauí Captaincy, opposed against Portuguese farmers. This lasted from 1712 to 1719.

== Mandu Ladino ==
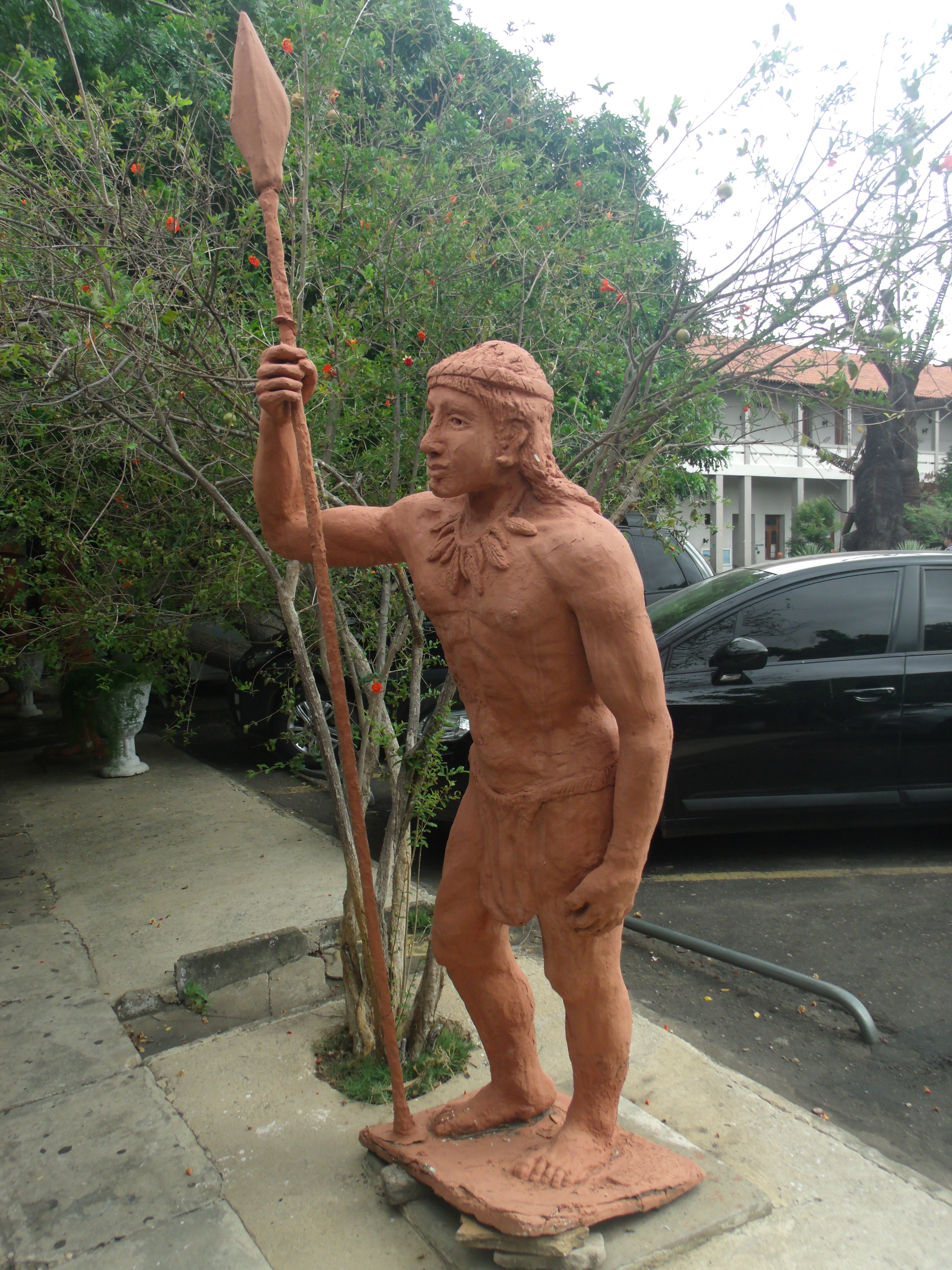
A ceramic statue of Mandu Ladino in the Central de Artesanato Mestre Dezinho in Teresina

Mandu Ladino was born in São Miguel do Tapuio. His parents died when he was 12. Ladino was then sent to the Cariri village of Boqueirão where he was taught by a Capuchin priest ostensibly called Lucé. Ladino stayed there for eight years, before witnessing another teacher, Martinho, burning all the sacred images of the indigenous people. As a result, Martinho’s church was burnt down and he killed by a blow to the head. After this, Ladino fled to a farm in Alegrete do Piauí to work as a slave. He then saw the chief's daughter murdered, so he gathered some Arani Indians to execute the residents.

== The Revolt ==
In 1701, a Royal charter was passed forbidding all cattle ranching up to 10 leagues from the coast, as this area's climate and soil made sugar cane plantations more profitable. As a result, cattle ranchers moved inland, invading into indigenous territory. Enraged, the indigenous people initially retaliated by killing farmer Antônio da Cunha Souto, due to his cruelty. The revolt, led by Ladino, spread to neighboring regions in Maranhão, Piauí and Ceará. Many Portuguese settlers were killed and more than a hundred ranches were destroyed. They also burned down many churches, however they made sure to remove any religious images before doing so.

The Portuguese, with the help of Jesuits from Serra Grande and led by Bernando de Carvalho de Aguiar, decided to counterattack by sending an expedition against the insurgents. Ladino managed to escape the forces, while the remaining Aranis were killed. In 1716, Ladino was killed by the Tobajaras after trying to flee in the Parnaíba River.
