= Alegrete (disambiguation) =

Alegrete is a Brazilian municipality in Rio Grande do Sul, Brazil.

Alegrete may also refer to:

- Alegrete do Piauí, a municipality in Piauí, Brazil
- Alegrete (Portalegre), a civil parish in the district of Portalegre, near Serra de São Mamede, Portugal
  - Castle of Alegrete, a castle in the civil parish of Alegrete, Portugal
