= Manuel Arruda da Câmara =

- Born: 1752; Pombal, Paraíba
- Died: October 2, 1810 (aged 57–58); Goiana, Pernambuco
- Scientific career
- Fields: Botany
- Author abbrev. (botany): Arruda

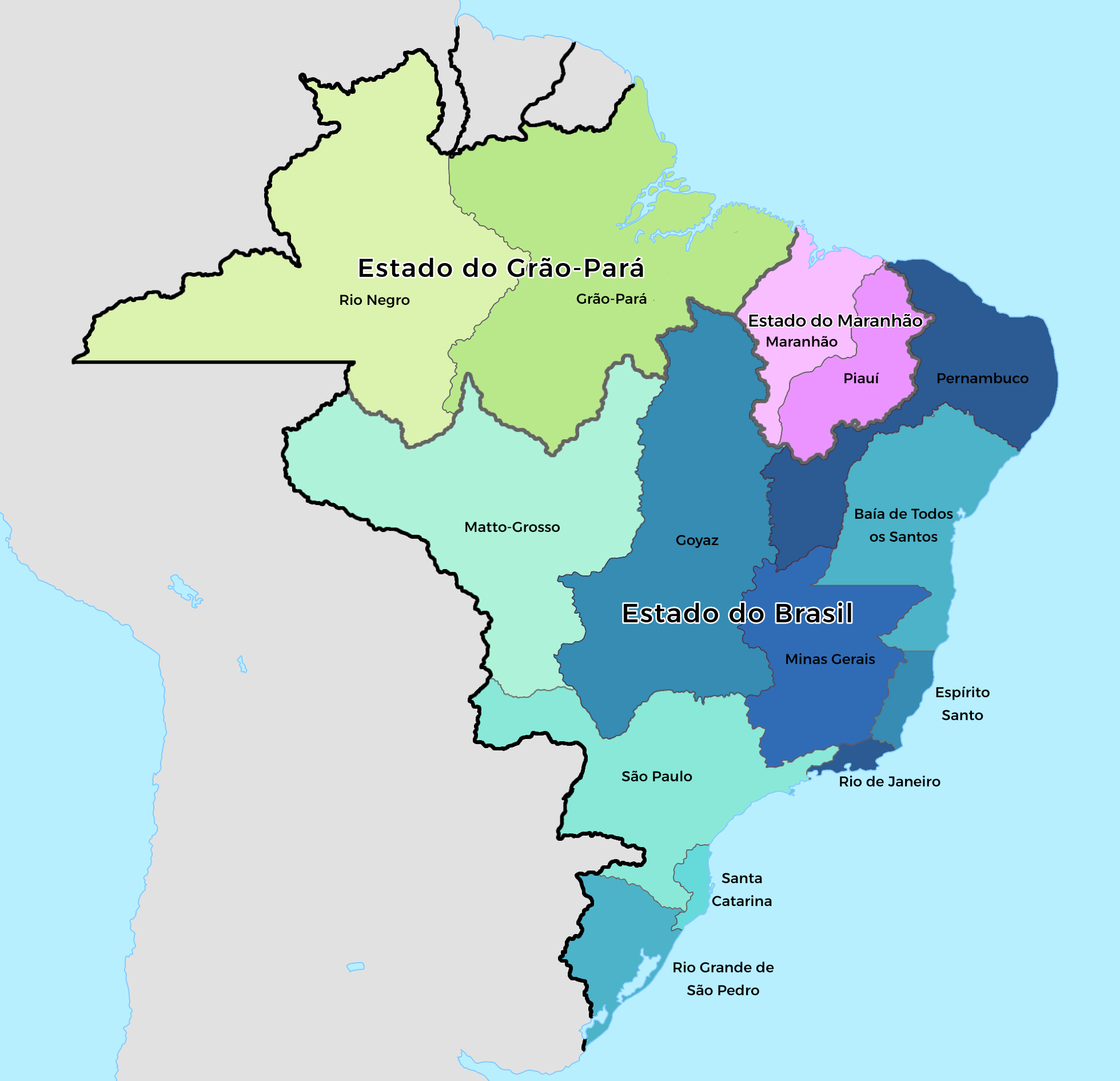
Brazil 1778

Padre Manuel Arruda da Câmara (Pombal 1752–Goiana, October 2, 1810) was a Brazilian cleric, physician and scientist, who became known as one of the great Brazilian botanists of the late eighteenth century.

== Life ==
His parents, Francisco Arruda da Câmara and Maria Saraiva da Silva, were New Christians, (Cristão-novo) Jews who were forced to convert to Christianity in the Spanish and Portuguese lands by the Inquisition. Born in the hinterland of Paraíba State, his father was a farmer. He was initially educated in Goiana, Pernambuco and on November 23, 1783 he took orders at the Carmelitas Calçados monastery of Calçados in Goiana, Pernambuco State, adopting the name Frei Manuel do Coração de Jesus. Following this, he and his brother Francisco travelled to Europe to further their studies. He attended the University of Coimbra in 1786, where he graduated in Natural Philosophy, and then after moving to Montpellier, France, in 1790 he received his doctorate in medicine from the University of Montpellier.

While in France he had come in contact with the ideas of Voltaire and Rousseau, and the spirit of the French Revolution. Back in Brazil he became keenly aware of social injustice in his own society. He was also a Freemason and founded the Areopagus Lodge (Areópago de Itambé), a liberal philosophical society which attracted a number of local intellectuals and was involved in the Conspiracy of Suaçunas in 1801. This was one of the early attempts to liberate Brazil from Portuguese colonial rule in Brazil (Movimentos Emancipacionistas). The lodge was closed down by the authorities in 1802, and da Câmara would not see independence achieved in his lifetime. In 1805 he relinquished his vows.

== Career ==
On returning to Brazil in 1793 he became established in Goiana and undertook a series of mineralogical, botanical and zoological expeditions for the Portuguese Crown in the North east from 1794–1800. Between March 1794 and September 1795 he explored Pernambuco and Piauí for minerals, Paraíba and Ceará from December 1797 to July 1799, and was in Maranhão from 1799 to 1800. He also explored the basin of the São Francisco River.

== Work ==
He wrote extensively on the agriculture and natural history of the region, often with a philosophical perspective and a desire for improvement. In some of his work he collaborated with a fellow priest, Padre João Ribeiro Pessoa de Mello Montenegro and they provided illustrations for works such as Centúrias dos novos gêneros e espécies das plantas pernambucanas.

In 1810 he produced two pamphlets, the Dissertação sobre as plantas do Brazil, a discussion of Brazilian plants suitable for replacing hemp, and Discurso sobre a vitalidade da instituição de jardins on the suitability of establishing gardens in Brazil. His intention had been to compile an illustrated flora of Pernambuco, his Centúrias, but it remained unfinished at his death and was never published. In all. he described 31 new species. He was visited by Henry Koster, the American explorer, in 1810 during the latter's travels in Brazil, and who was later to incorporate some of Arruda's work into his own book of that name, published in 1816.

== Publications ==
- Physiologico-chemicae, de influentia oxigenii in oeeconomia animali, precipe in calore, et calore hominum. Joannem Martel natu majorem, Regis Universitatisque Typographum consuetum, Montpellier. 1791. (Doctoral dissertation)
- Aviso aos lavradores sobre a suposta fermentação de qualquer qualidade de grãos ou pevides para aumento da colheita, A. Rodrigues Galhardo, Lisbon, 1792.
- Anúncio dos descobrimentos feitos em Paranambuco e remetido a um dos editors. Paládio Portugués ou Clarim de Palas do mês de maio de 1796 1(2): 4–13.
- Câmara, Manuel Arruda de (1799). Memoria sobre a cultura dos Algodoeiros e sobre o método de o escolher e ensacar, etc., em que se propõem alguns planos novos para o seu melhoramento. Lisbon: Oficina da Casa Literária do Arco do Cego.
- Câmara, Manuel Arrruda da (1810). Dissertação sobre as plantas do Brazil: que podem dar linhos proprios para muitos usos da sociedade, e suprir a falta do Canahmo. Rio de Janeiro: Na Impressâo Regia.
- Discurso sobre a uitalidade da instituição de jardins nas principais províncias do brasil, Impressão Régia, Rio de Janeiro 1810.
- Memórias sobre o algodão de Pernambuco, Lisbon, 1810.
- Memórias sobre as plantas de que se podem fazer a barrilha entre nós, Memórias da Academia Real das Ciências de Lisboa, v.4: 83–93, 1814.
- Tratado de Agricultura.
- Tratado da lógica.
- A almêcega e a carnaúba. Diário de Pernambuco, “Revista Diária”, Recife. (Posthumous 28 Nov 1886).
- Centúrias dos novos gêneros e espécies das plantas pernambucanas (unfinished; Centuria plantarum pernambucensium -Cent. plant. Pern.)

== Legacy ==
The genus Arrudea Cambess. (Clusiaceae) is named in his honour. In his home state of Paraíba, the Zoological and Botanical gardens (Parque Zoobotânico Arruda Câmara) in João Pessoa, the capital city, bear his name. Also a chair in the Academia Paraibana de Letras is named after him.

Arruda da Câmara's botanical contributions have not been well served by history, for instance the multiple inaccuracies in the Index Kewensis. Henry Koster incorporated parts of the Dissertação and the Discurso in translation into his Travels in Brazil, as an appendix. While Koster's work was largely read, reprinted and translated, Arruda da Câmara's work was largely unknown, and consequently Arruda da Câmara's discoveries were incorrectly attributed to Koster. Taxa are correctly referred to as "Arruda Cent. plant. Pern." In 1873 a botanical dictionary appeared based on da Câmara's manuscripts.

== See also ==
- Areopagus lodge
- Conspiracy of Suaçunas
- Henry Koster

== Bibliography ==
- Holanda, Sérgio Buarque de (1970). História Geral da Civilização Brasileira. São Paulo: Difusão Europeia do Livro. pp. 207–237.
- Aveline, Carlos Cardoso. "A História Secreta da Independência". Archived from the original on 24 September 2015.
- Magalhães, Cláudio Márcio Ribeiro; Silva, Valdir Carlos da. "História do desenvolvimento da matemática e cultura no brasil colonial" (PDF). V Seminário internacional de pesquisa em educação matemática 28 a 31 de outubro de 2012, Petrópolis, Rio de janeiro, Brasil.
- Kury, Lorelai (2004). "Homens de ciência no Brasil: impérios coloniais e circulação de informações (1780-1810)". História, Ciências, Saúde-Manguinhos. 11: 109–129. doi:10.1590/S0104-59702004000400006. PMID 15446267.
- Losada, Janaina Zito; Puig-Samper, Miguel Ángel; Domingues, Heloisa Maria Bertol (2013). Um Álbum para o Imperador: A comissão científica do pacífico e o Brasil. Museu de Astronomia e Ciencias Afins Rio de Janeiro. ISBN 978-85-7078-347-9.
- Kirkbride, Joseph H. (August 2007). "A 19th Century Brazilian botanical dictionary". Taxon. 56 (3): 927–937. doi:10.2307/25065874. JSTOR 25065874. Archived from the original on September 5, 2012.
- Ministério da Cultura (2015). "Rede de Memória Virtual Brasileira".
- Robert Zander (1984). Fritz Encke; Günther Buchheim; Siegmund Seybold (eds.). Handwörterbuch der Pflanzennamen (13th ed.). Stuttgart: Ulmer Verlag. ISBN 3-8001-5042-5.
- van Rijckevorsel, Paul (November 2002). "(1564) Proposal to Conserve the Name Platonia insignis against Moronobea esculenta (Guttiferae)". Taxon. 51 (4): 813–815. doi:10.2307/1555050. JSTOR 1555050.
- Mello, José Antônio Gonsalves de, ed. (1982). Manuel Arruda da Câmara: obras reunidas, c.1752-1811. Recife: Prefeitura da Cidade do Recife, Secretaria de Educação e Cultura, Fundação de Cultura Cidade do Recife. p. 331.

=== Historical sources ===
- Britten, J. (1896). "Arruda's Brazilian plants". Journal of Botany, British and Foreign. 34: 242–250.
- Koster, Henry (1816). Travels in Brazil. London: Longman, Hurst, Rees, Orme, and Brown.
- Pinto, Joaquim de Almeida (1873). Diccionario de botanica brasileira: ou, Compendio dos vegetaes do Brasil, tanto indigenas como acclimados, revista por uma commissão da Sociedade Vellosiana, e approvada pela faculdade de medicina da corte ... Coordenado e redigido em grande parte sobre os manuscriptos do Dr. Arruda Camara. Rio de Janeiro: Typographia-Perseverança.
