= Areopagus Lodge =

The Areopagus Lodge (also known as the Areopagus of Itambé) was the first Masonic lodge in Brazil and the first secret society in Pernambuco. It was founded in 1796 in Itambé, Pernambuco by Manuel Arruda da Câmara, a former Carmelite friar who had been educated in France. It was inspired by the ideals of the French Revolution including the Conspiracy of Suassuna which aimed to create an independent republic allied to Napoleon Bonaparte. The failure of this attempted coup meant that the Lodge was closed in 1802. The Academies of Cabo and Paraíso were created from their old affiliates.

The Masonic Square and Compasses.

The lodge's initial members included the brothers of the Alvarez family, the three Cavalcanti de Albuquerque brothers, priests Velho Cardoso, Pereira Tinoco, Montenegro Albuquerque, Joao Pessoa Ribeiro, and José Luis Lima Cavalcanti, the latter being the vicar of Recife, Pernambuco.

The Aeropagus Lodge's Masonic Obedience was the Grand Orient of Pernambuco Independent, affiliated with the Masonic Confederation of Brazil. The lodge was founded as a political project, based on the struggle for equality, liberty and fraternity. The location of the foundation of the First Masonic Lodge in Brazil was strategic, because the house where it was founded was on the borderline of the two cities of the states of Pernambuco and Paraiba, formerly Villas of the provinces of Pernambuco and Paraiba. According to the documents and historical references made by former residents of both cities, it is said that the Areopagite, and masons of the time, constantly gathered in that house and artifacts, symbols and insignia were taken to the meeting and after each meeting were taken to the home of the Masons not to arouse suspicion. However, due to the constant flow of influential people on the roads nearby, the influence of Freemasonry was perceived, and complaints were made to the Imperial power, who by 1802, sent a troop of the Imperial Guard to the region. Some Masons fled, to sow Masonry in other locations, such as Merchants of Cape St. Agosatinho, Recife, and other Igarassu.

== See also ==
- Grande Oriente do Brasil
- History of Pernambuco
