= Conjuration of Our Father =

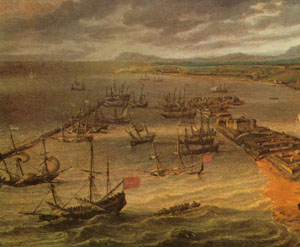
- Recife Port in the 17th century
Date	1666
Location	Olinda, Pernambuco, Colonial Brazil
Result	Portuguese victory

Belligerents
Portugal: State of Brazil	Pernambucan rebels

Commanders and leaders
Mendonça Furtado (POW)	Unknown

The Conjuration of Our Father was a revolt led by the rebels of Pernambuco against the Portuguese Empire because of the discontent of the new proclaimed governor, Jerônimo de Mendonça Furtado.

== Background ==
After the expulsion of the Dutch from the region in 1654, the local landowning elites, particularly the sugar mill owners of Olinda, expected to gain more recognition and influence within the Portuguese colonial administration. They had resisted against the Dutch and felt that their efforts had been overlooked by the Portuguese Crown. Later, the Crown appointed outsiders to govern the captaincy, including Jerônimo de Mendonça Furtado, which upset the Pernambucans, expecting a local to be appointed to govern rather than an outsider.

== The Revolt ==
The immediate trigger of the revolt was the arrival of a French fleet in the port of Recife. Under orders from the Portuguese court, Governor Mendonça Furtado ensured the French were treated well, which led to suspicions among the local population. Rumors spread that the governor was secretly aiding the French, and that they intended to invade and pillage Pernambuco. These suspicions aligned with the deep frustrations of the landowners, who already felt betrayed by the crown's decisions. In response, a group of insurgents from Olinda orchestrated a plot to depose the governor, which came to be known as the Conjuração de "Nosso Pai". The insurgents managed to arrest Mendonça Furtado and remove him from power.

== Aftermath ==
Although the rebels succeeded in deposing the governor, the revolt did not lead to significant political changes. The Portuguese Crown quickly intervened to restore order in the colony, sending reinforcements to Pernambuco. The leaders of the conspiracy were punished, and the Portuguese reasserted their control.

== See also ==
- Insurrection of Pernambuco
- Dutch invasions of Brazil
