= April Revolt (Pernambuco) =

The April Revolt, or Abrilada in Brazil's history was an episode in 1832 in the then province of Pernambuco, which fits into the Regency Period, in the context of Cabanagem. After the abdication of D. Pedro I of Brazil (Pedro IV of Portugal) and his return to Europe where he played a decisive role in the Portuguese Civil War (1828–1834), the movement in Pernambuco, a conservative and absolutist, aimed at the renewal of D. Pedro I to the throne.

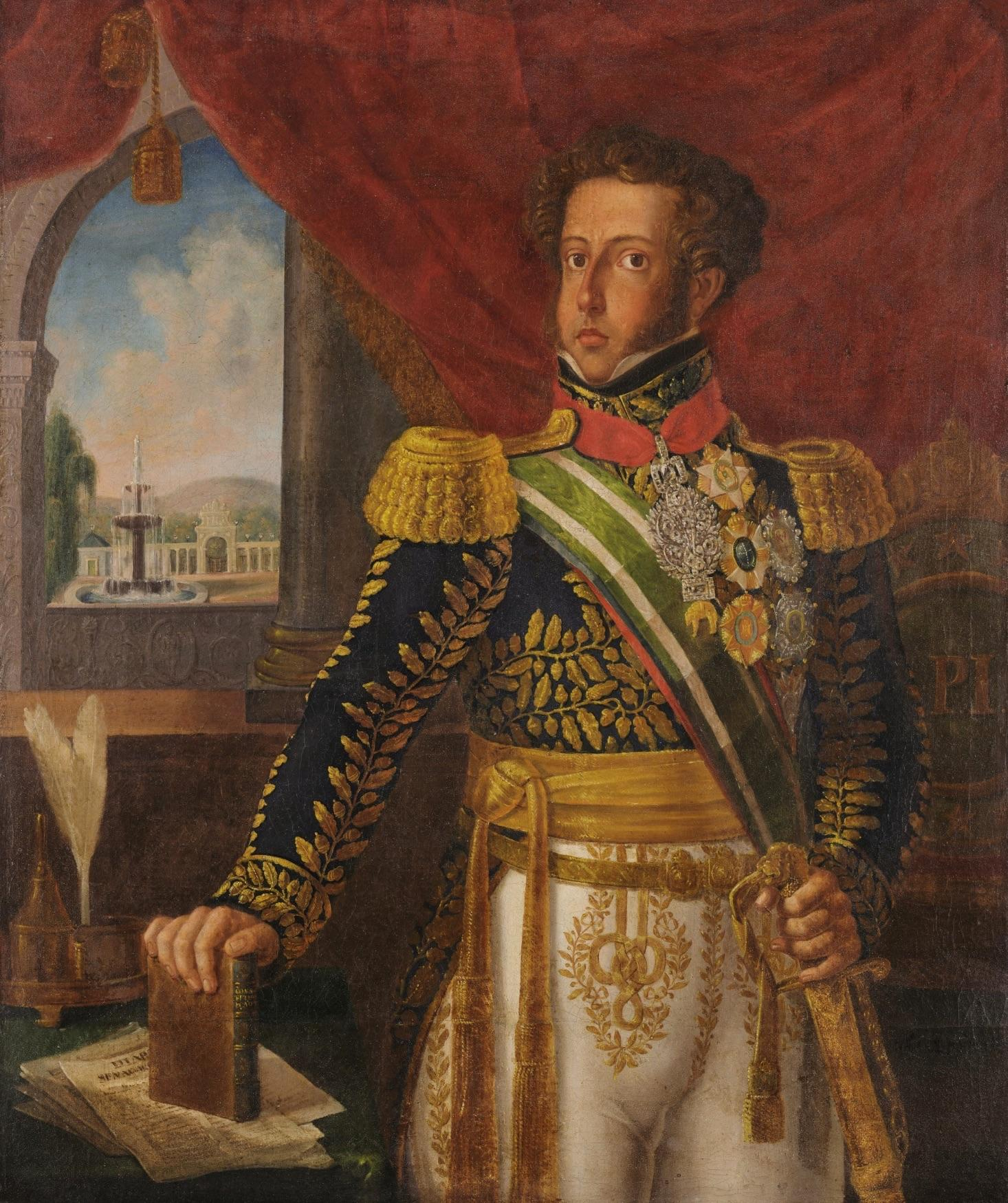
Portrait of Pedro I.

== History ==
The movement emerged among the major Portuguese merchants of Recife, who controlled the trade of the city and province, and since the country's independence, were much harassed by the population. Gathered around the Masonic Lodge "Column of the Throne and Altar." On April 14, 1832, promoted the rise of a military battalion in Recife, under the leadership of Lt. Col. José Francisco Martins and Major José Gabriel de Morais Meyer. On the 15th, clashes started in the streets that continued for nearly a week. After three days of fighting, the President of the Province of Pernambuco, Manuel de Carvalho Pães de Andrade, with the help of students from the School of law of Olinda, managed to isolate the rebels in a suburb of Recife and in the Forte de São João Batista do Brum. The main leaders, however, managed to escape and were to join their allies in the interior.

Within the province, unrest led to the War of Cabanos or Cabanada, revolution that gripped much of Pernambuco and Alagoas 1832 to 1835. They were led by Lt. Col. Dominic Lawrence Torres Galindo, Vicente Ferreira de Paula (who led a group of rebels coming from Alagoas, in the context of repression of Cabanada), Caetano Alves and others. Students of law of Olinda attended a convocation and strengthened government forces.

Between May and June 1832, there were riots Antônio Timóteo de Andrade, in Panelas de Miranda, in rural Pernambuco, and João Batista de Araújo, on the beach in Barra Grande, now the county town of Maragogi in Alagoas. On October 26, 1832, provincial troops killed Antônio Timóteo de Andrade at the stronghold of Feijão, while Almirante Tamandaré was arrested at his home on the beach in Barra Grande, and João Batista de Araújo. Between November 1832 and January 1834, the movement's leadership passed into the popular forces, and the general commander Vincente de Paula the supreme leader of the Cabanos, unifying the insurgent leadership and seeking the support of blacks Papa-Méis, who lived in the woods . He began his attacks on the sugar mills to free the slaves. For a short time he had the support of the cariri villages of Jacuípe, Fulniôs of Águas Belas, Palmeira dos Índios, Garanhuns and Escalas. The fight continued even after the death of D. Pedro I, on September 24, 1834.

The loyalist forces under the command of Colonel Joaquim José Luis de Souza, same in number more than 6,000 men, could not dominate the rebels by force. Thus, faced with this impasse, the colonel turned to mediation by the then Bishop of Pernambuco, D. João da Purificação Marques Perdigão. This then went to the interior of the Province, to meet with Vincente de Paula, head of the rebels and persuaded him to make peace, which was signed in November 1835.

== See also ==
- War of the Peddlers 1710 to 1711
- Conspiracy of Suassuna 1801
- 1817 Revolution 1817
- Confederation of the Equator 1824
- Cabanada 1832 to 1835
- Praieira Revolution 1848 to 1850
