= São Domingos, Paraíba =

Coordinates: 6.81389°S 37.9419°W

São Domingos
- Municipality
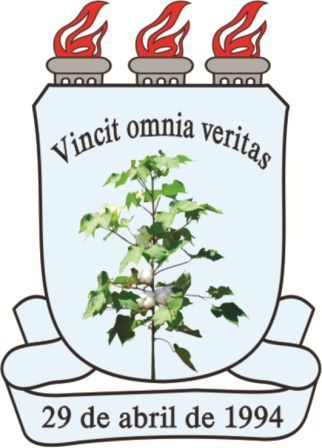
- Flag Coat of arms
- Interactive map of São Domingos
- Country: Brazil
- Region: Northeast
- State: Paraíba
- Mesoregion: Sertao Paraibana

Population (2020)
  - Total: 3,097
- Time zone: UTC−3 (BRT)

São Domingos (formerly São Domingos de Pombal) is a municipality in the state of Paraíba in the Northeast Region of Brazil.

== See also ==
- List of municipalities in Paraíba
