= Henry Koster (author) =

English coffee-grower, explorer, botanist and author

- Born: c. 1793; Lisbon, Portugal
- Died: 15 May 1820 (aged 26–27); Pernambuco, Kingdom of Brazil
- Occupations: coffee-planter, traveller, author

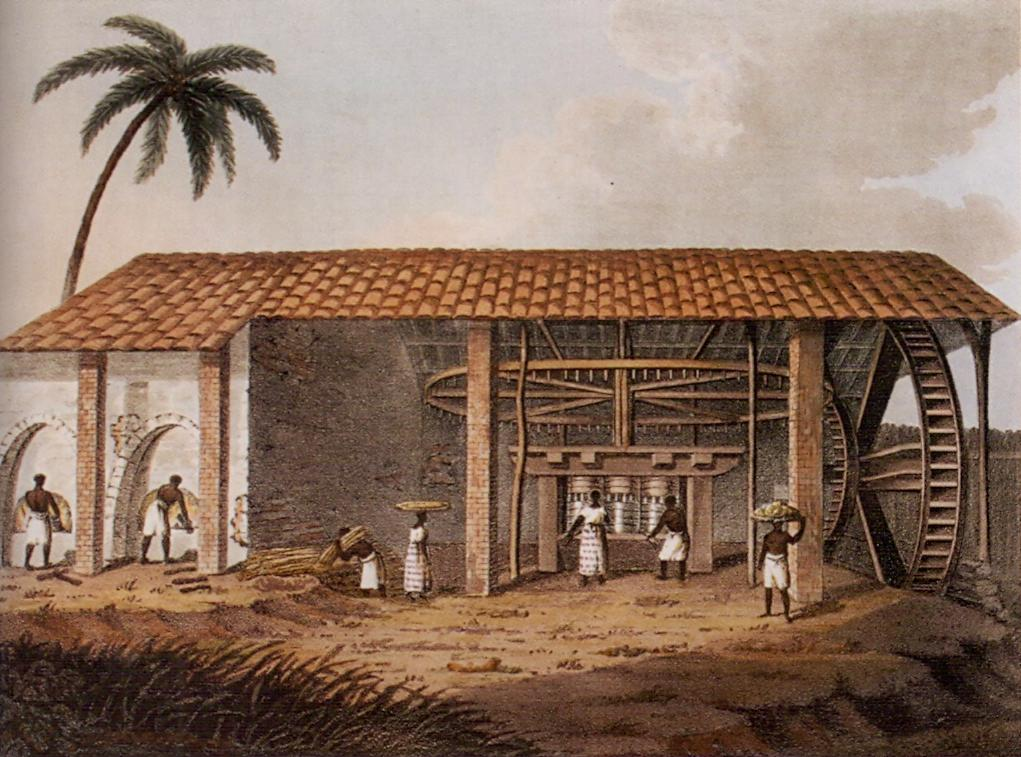
A Brazilian sugar mill, as sketched by Koster in 1816

Henry Koster (c. 1793 – 15 May 1820), also known in Portuguese as Henrique da Costa, was an English coffee-grower, explorer and author who spent most of his short adult life in Brazil, writing about his travels, slavery, and other subjects.

His work was also published in French under the name of Henri Koster.

== Life ==
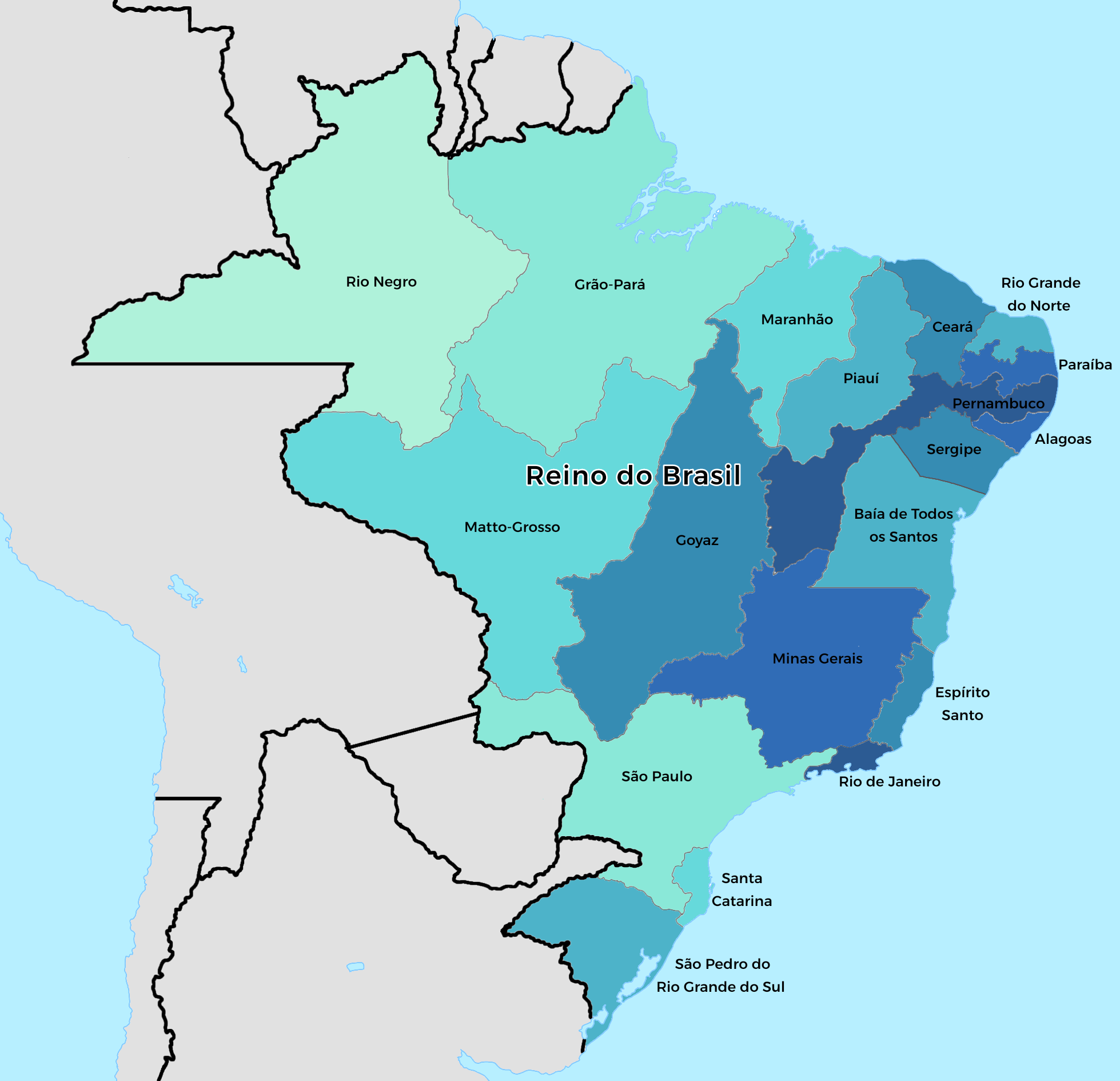
Brazil at the time of Koster

The son of John Theodore Koster, of Liverpool, a sugar merchant, Koster was born in Portugal. In 1809 he was sent to Pernambuco because it was thought to be the way to improve his poor health. He sailed from Liverpool in a ship called Lucy on 2 November 1809, travelling with a family friend, and arrived in Recife, Brazil, on 7 December. He spent a year at Recife before beginning a programme of travels around the country. In 1812 he rented an estate at Jaguaribe, where he slept in a hammock in an unfinished church until he could get possession of the big house, bought slaves, and established himself as a fazendeiro, growing and exporting coffee. Koster spent the rest of his life in Brazil, except for short visits to England. While in Brazil, he pursued a particular study of the institution of slavery there, travelling widely, and began to write books about his experiences that were published in London. His works are considered the most detailed accounts of north-east Brazil written in English in his period.

Koster was a friend of the poet Robert Southey, who encouraged him to write his Travels in Brazil (1816), which was dedicated to Southey "in memorial of affectionate respect and gratitude". He began but did not finish a translation into Portuguese of Southey's multi-volume History of Brazil (1810–1819). Southey mentions the sad loss of his young friend Koster in his Sir Thomas Marc (1831).

He died in Pernambuco on 15 May 1820. A report of the death in The Gentleman's Magazine said he was "in his 27th year".

== Major works ==
- Henry Koster, Travels in Brazil (London: Longman, Hurst, Rees, Orme, and Brown, 1816)
  - Voyage dans la partie septentrionale du Brésil, depuis 1809 jusqu'en 1815 (Paris: 1818)
- On the Amelioration of Slavery (1816)

== See also ==
- Manuel Arruda da Câmara

== Bibliography ==
- Anderson Carvalho Sandes, British Travel Accounts and Maps: Henry Koster and the Making of Space in Nineteenth-Century Brazil (2010)
- Kirkbride, Joseph H. (August 2007). "A 19th Century Brazilian botanical dictionary". Taxon. 56 (3): 927–937. Bibcode:2007Taxon..56..927K. doi:10.2307/25065874. JSTOR 25065874. Archived from the original on 5 September 2012.
