= Serra Grande, Paraíba =

Coordinates: 7°12′54″S 38°22′12″W

- Municipality
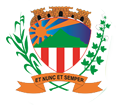
- Coat of arms
- Interactive map of Serra Grande, Paraíba
- Country: Brazil
- Region: Northeast
- State: Paraíba
- Mesoregion: Sertao Paraibana

Population (2020)
  - Total: 2,916
- Time zone: UTC−3 (BRT)

Serra Grande, Paraíba is a municipality in the state of Paraíba in the Northeast Region of Brazil.

== See also ==
- List of municipalities in Paraíba
