= Guanais Federation =

1832 nativist revolution in Brazil

The Guanais Federation (Portuguese: Federação do Guanais), also called the Guanais Revolt or Federalist Revolution, was a nativist revolution that took place in Bahia in 1832, in the villages of São Félix and Cachoeira, with a minor recurrence in 1833, constituting one of the seeds that led to the larger revolt of 1837, known as the Sabinada.

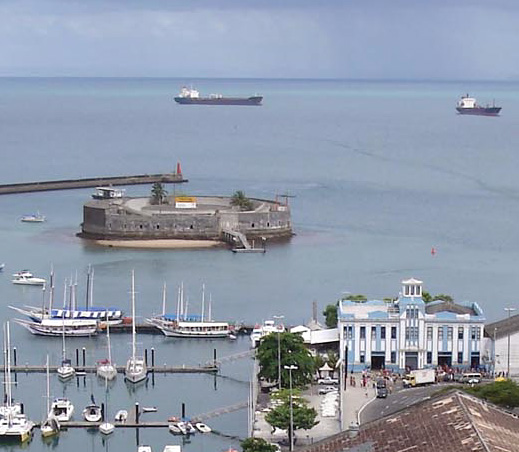
São Marcelo Fort, where Guanais Mineiro raised the flag of revolt after inciting the garrison to rebellion

== Background ==
There was a strong desire for autonomy and republicanism in Bahia, which was still present in the 18th century with the Bahian Conspiracy. From this initial movement, the ideology reemerged in revolts and served as a rallying cry to unite the people of Bahia in the struggle for independence, which began in the state even before the official proclamation in 1822 and ended only on 2 July 1823.

The situation in Brazil after its emancipation remained undefined, with various ideological currents seeking greater change, aggravated above all by the solution found with the abdication of Pedro I in favor of his son, who was still a minor.

In the Recôncavo Baiano region, secret societies were buzzing with activity, planning uprisings and revolts, which the Court combated by promoting potential leaders to positions in remote areas. In Salvador, nativism had caused unrest in April, May, August, and October 1831, with calls for the deportation of the Portuguese and a clear federalist spirit.

During the Permanent Triumvirate, several rebellious and revolutionary movements took place (classified in historiography under the generic title of "nativist movements"), and one of them finally broke out in Bahia in 1832.

== A brief Republic ==
Representation of the federalist flag, raised at Forte do Mar

From the village of São Félix, in the Recôncavo Baiano region, Bernardo Miguel Guanais Mineiro led a violent federalist movement that, in February 1832, established a provisional government.

Nine years after the War of Independence of Bahia, the republican and emancipationist ideas that motivated the Bahian people to fight led the revolutionaries to believe that it was time to change the regime, which was then troubled by uncertainty about what form of government would replace the Emperor.

Despite the support they received from landowners, who were still strongly influenced by federalist sentiment, their forces were unable to overcome the resistance of the established power.

The government's response was led by the Viscount of Pirajá. After three days of fighting, the rebels surrendered and their leader, Guanais Mineiro, was sent to prison at Forte do Mar – a circular fort built on an artificial island to defend the port of Salvador.

On 26 April 1833, Guanais Mineiro managed to revolt against the fortification where he was confined and, from there, bombarded Salvador. They raised a flag with three stripes: white, blue, and white, and demanded, unsuccessfully, to negotiate.

This last uprising was the "swan song" of revolutionary leader Guanais Mineiro, who was sent from there to the Bahian hinterland where, far from the turmoil of the capital, he ended his days, leaving behind many descendants.

== The republican sentiment ==
Despite the failure of this initiative, republican ideals remained alive among the people of Bahia. They erupted once again with the Sabinada rebellion and gained momentum at the end of the Second reign, under the auspices of Bahian leaders such as Rui Barbosa, Cezar Zama, and many others, until finally culminating in the Proclamation of 1889.

== Timeline ==
The main dates of events featuring Guanais Mineiro:

- 28 October 1831, in Campo Grande;
- 24 February 1832, in the village of Cachoeira;
- March 1832, in Cachoeira and São Félix;
- 26 and 27 April 1833, at Forte do Mar, in Salvador.

== See also ==
- Sabinada
