= Chiriguano War =

The war against the Chiriguanos of 1892 is the name given to a series of armed confrontations during the presidency of Aniceto Arce, between the Bolivian State and a great Messianic Chiriguano movement (Ava Guaraní) led by its leader, Apiaguaiki Tumpa.

The indigenous Chiriguanos at that time were located in what was known as the Chiriguano mountain range in the current Santa Cruz department of Bolivia. The conflict originated from the increasing presence of farmers in the region and from the abuses committed by them towards the Chiriguanos, who revolted, with the open intention of expelling them all from their territories.
