= Cabanada =

Rebellion that occurred in the Empire of Brazil between 1832 and 1835

War of Cabanos
Date	1832 – 1835
Location	Provinces of Pernambuco, Alagoas and Pará
Result	Government victory

Belligerents
Empire of Brazil: National Guard	Rebels in Pernambuco, Alagoas and Pará

Strength
7,000 soldiers	4,000 rebels

The Cabanada or War of Cabanos was a rebellion that occurred in the Empire of Brazil between 1832 and 1835. it started shortly after the abdication of Dom Pedro I, during the regency period.

== Background ==
The new regime was facing financial difficulties, with foreign trade almost stagnant, cotton and cane sugar prices declining, and the privilege customs to England, in force since 1810, continuing. This financial instability led to riots that erupted throughout the Empire of Brazil in that period.

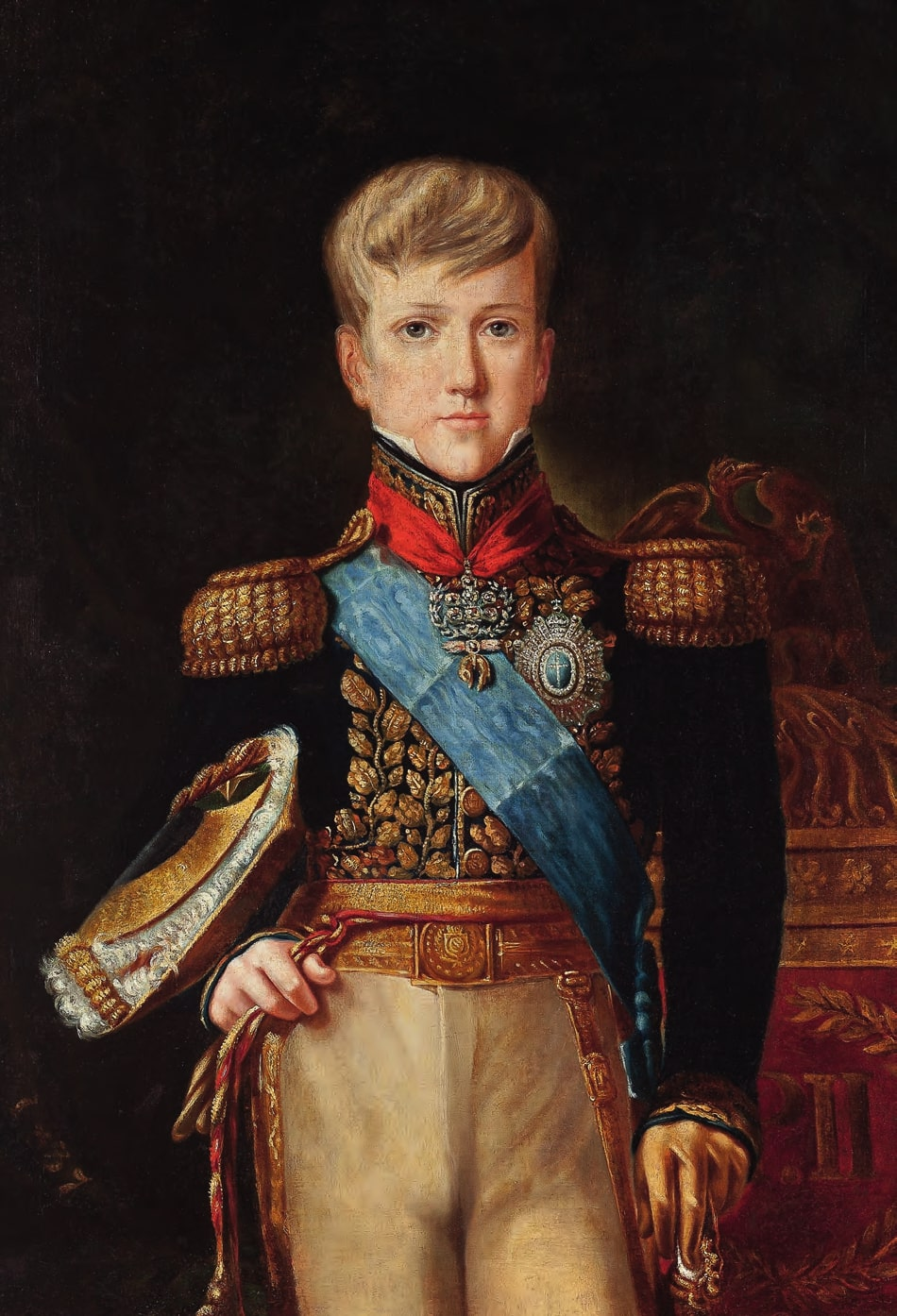
Emperor Pedro II at age 12 wearing a court dress and the Order of the Golden Fleece, 1838

The Cabanada movement was active in Pernambuco, Alagoas, and Pará, but insurrections arose in different places and different times. The first one deals with the revolt in Pernambuco and Alagoas and the second in the Pará region.

== Pernambuco and Alagoas ==
In Pernambuco, where the rebellion was known as "The War of Cabanada," the conservative Cabanadas demanded the return of the Portuguese monarch to the throne of Brazil. Rioting occurred in Zona da Mata and Agreste. Its leader was Vicente de Paula, with followers of humble origin, predominantly Indians (Jacuípe and others) and slaves on the run (called papaméis).

With the death of D. Pedro I in Portugal (1834), the movement had lost its impetus, and the rebellion ended with a peace conference arranged by Bishop João da Purificação Marques Perdigão. Even so, the governors Manoel de Carvalho Paes de Andrade and Antonio Pinto da Gama Chichorro sent an army of 4000 soldiers to surround the place, arresting hundreds of insurgents.

== Pará ==
The insurrection of Cabanada in Pará was more severe because it was a nationalist movement and wanted the independence of the province. It lasted about 5 years, pacified by the Marechal Soares de Andréa, Baron Caçapava at the expense of several bloody conflicts and executions of insurgents.

At the end of Cabanada, the leader Vicente de Paula was arrested and sent to the island of Fernando de Noronha

== See also ==
- War of the Peddlers 1710 to 1711
- Conspiracy of Suassuna 1801
- 1817 Revolution 1817
- Confederation of the Equator 1824
- April Revolt 1832
- Praieira Revolution 1848 to 1850
