= Port of Recife =

Port in Recife, Brazil

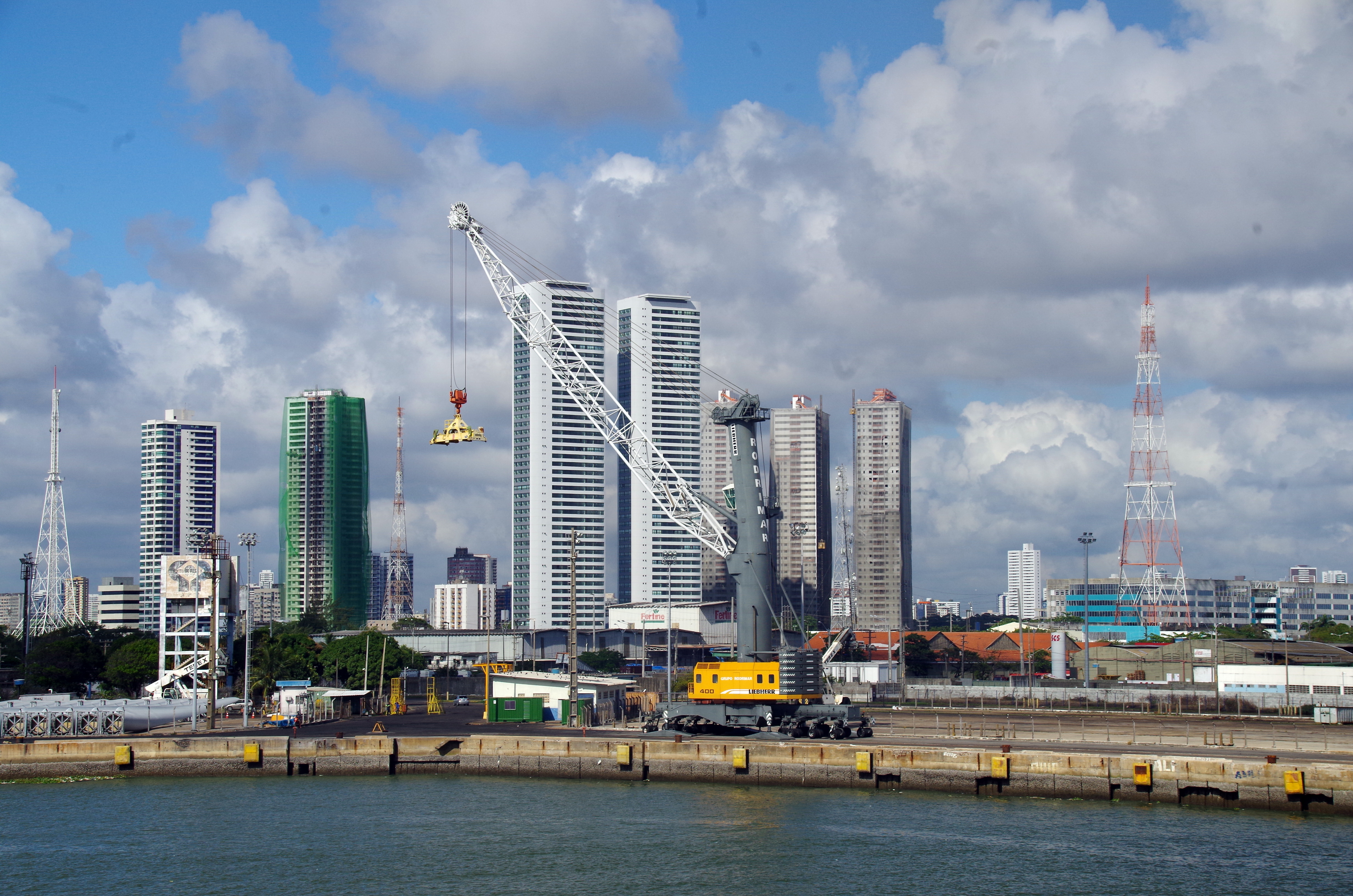
Port of Recife

Recife Port is located in Recife Antigo in the city of Recife. This international port serves the RMR and has two main operational areas: cruises and cargo. It is located on the eastern island of Recife antigo on the banks of rivers Capibaribe and Beberibe. Differentiates itself from another ports located in the city center the fact that the port does not have any interferences with the center. Its administered by the Government of the state of Pernambuco and is historically deeply linked with the arrive of the first settlers in Recife (1537).

== Origins ==
- The commercial operation occurred on September 12, 1918, with 2125 sq/m of area and 3 warehouses. Since June 1, 2001, through the accord delegation n. 02/2001, the responsibility of the administration and operation of the port has been held by the state government of Pernambuco through the new company Porto de Recife S.A.
- Historically, the port was the main reason of the foundation of the village of Recife in the 16th century. In the 16th century, the increasing movement of import, production and export of sugar, emerged along the vicinity of the port bringing the pioneer European settlers to live exclusively from commerce. The history of the port is deeply linked to the economic growth and the social-economic and cultural development of the city, the state of Pernambuco and the Northeast region of Brazil; it is the main point of trade in goods and supplies to another states.

== Port Structure ==
=== Cruises ===
The port handles National and international cruises mainly of those connecting Fernando de Noronha with Brazil, Caribbean islands and South America. The Brazilian and foreign tourists who come to Recife on a cruise ship will use a new Passengers Terminal (2009) where before was warehouse n.7; with stores, food court and information kiosks. Also, will have an increase in depth from 8.4 m to 11.5 meters deep, what originates will no longer be necessary to do transfer between large and small ships as before.

=== Cargo ===
There are two access channels to the Port, both of natural characteristics. The main one, South Channel, has 260 m of width and 3.4 km (2.11 mi) of extension approximately, with a depth of 10.5 m. The other, denominated North Channel, has little width, about 1.00 km (0.6 mi) of length, and a depth of 6.5 m, and it is used only by small size vessels. In 2010 the port handled 1.9 million tons of cargo, and the main loads are sugar, wheat, corn, barley, malt, fertilizers, clinker and kelp.

== Accessibility ==
Road access to the port of Recife is accomplished, mainly, through the federal highways BR-232 (linking the interior of the state) and BR-101 (linking to other States to the north and the south of the State of Pernambuco). The main producing and consuming centers of the interior of the state and of the rest of the Northeast, are linked to Port by paved highways. Three lanes of the Railways of Companhia Ferroviária do Nordeste (CFN), Northeastern Railway Company, serve the main areas of production in the state, tying the Port of Recife respectively: to the capitals of the states placed to the north of Pernambuco (north log); to the cities of the interior of the State (log west); and to the cities of Maceió and Aracaju (south log). The International Airport of Guararapes is 14 km (8.6 mi) away from the Port going in a Southwest direction.
