= Wallber Virgolino =

Brazilian politician (born 1978)

Member of the Chamber of Deputies
- Incumbent
- Assumed office 1 February 2019
- Constituency: Paraíba

Personal details
- Born: 15 October 1978 (age 47)
- Party: Liberal Party (since 2022)

Wallber Virgolino da Silva Ferreira (born 15 October 1978) is a Brazilian politician serving as a member of the Legislative Assembly of Paraíba since 2019. From 2013 to 2015, he served as secretary of penitentiary administration of Paraíba. From 2016 to 2017, he served as secretary of justice and citizenship of Rio Grande do Norte.
