= Conspiracy of Suassuna =

The Conspiracy of Suaçunas, also known by its archaic spelling, the Conspiracy of Suassuna, was a plot to overthrow Portuguese rule in Brazil at the turn of the 19th century. The conspiracy was centered in Olinda, Brazil.

== Background ==
In 1796, influenced by the ideas of the Enlightenment and the French Revolution, several leaders, including Manuel Alvarez House - a member of the Literary Society of Rio de Janeiro, and Manuel Arruda da Câmara - founded the Areopagus Masonic Lodge.

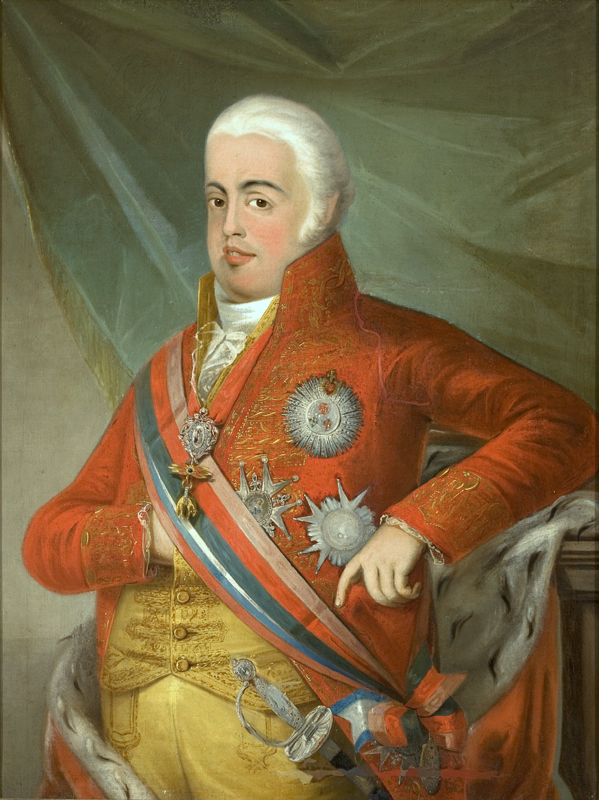
João VI, King of Portugal, Brazil, and the Algarves

The Enlightenment and the French Revolution were also discussed by priests and students of the Seminary of Olinda, founded by Bishop José Joaquim da Cunha Azeredo Coutinho on February 16, 1800. This institution had, among its members, Father Miguel Joaquim de Almeida Castro, who was involved in a future revolution in Pernambuco in 1817.

The philosophical and political discussions at the Areopagus Lodge evolved into a conspiracy against Portuguese rule in Brazil, with the goal of the emancipation of Pernambuco, becoming a republic under the protection of Napoleon Bonaparte. Included in the group of conspirators were the Cavalcanti brothers - Luis Francisco de Paula, José Francisco de Paula Cavalcanti e Albuquerque, and Francisco de Paula, the latter being owner of the Suaçuna mill, which gave its name to the movement.

On May 21, 1801, an informer told the authorities about the plans of the conspirators, which led to the arrest of several involved. Although an inquiry was initiated, the conspirators were acquitted for lack of evidence. The Areopagus Lodge was closed in 1802, and somewhat later reopened under the name of Suaçunas Academy, established in the same mill, the scene of meetings of former conspirators.

The episode is little known in the history of Brazil, since the inquiry was carried out in secrecy at the time, due to the high social position of those involved.

== Other Revolts ==
The conspiracy fits into the context of crisis of the colonial system. Despite the repression to those involved, their ideals reappear again, years later.

- 1817 Revolution 1817
- Confederation of the Equator 1824
- November Rebellion 1831
- Apr Revolt 1832
- Cabanada 1832 to 1835
- Praieira Revolution 1848 to 1850
