= Indian reductions in the Andes =

Settlements in the Andes to control and Christianize Indians

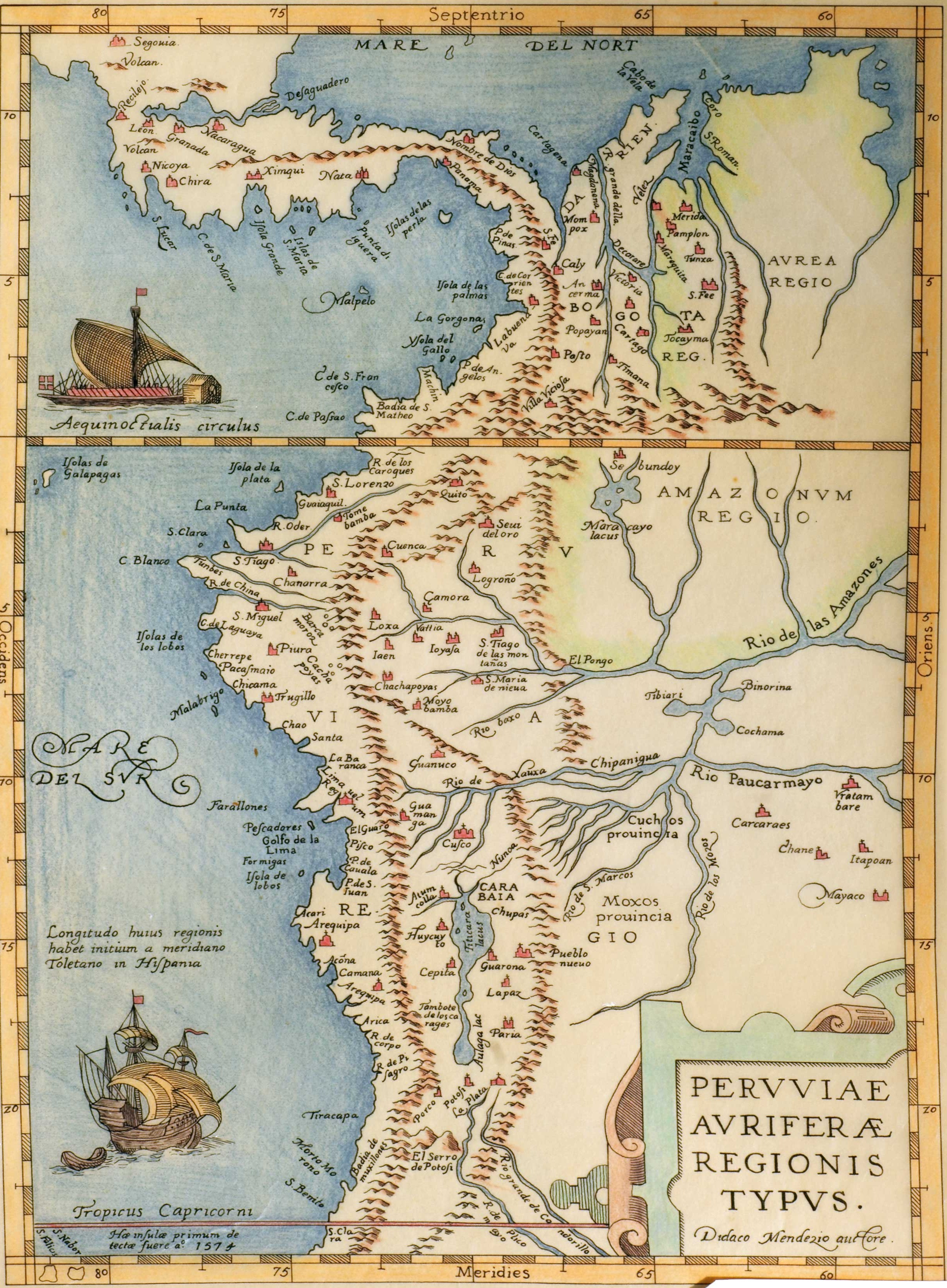
Peru in 1574 reached roughly from the Equator to the Tropic of Capricorn.

Indian reductions in the Andes (Spanish: reducciones de indios) were settlements in the former Inca Empire created by Spanish authorities and populated by the forcible relocation of indigenous Andean populations, called "Indians" by the Spanish and "Andeans" by some modern scholars. The purpose of the Spanish Empire was to gather native populations into centers called "Indian reductions" (reducciones de indios), to Christianize, tax, and govern them to comply with Spanish customs and economic interests.

Beginning in 1569, the viceroy Francisco de Toledo presided over the resettlement of about 1.4 million native people into approximately 840 reductions. The resettlement was carried out in the Royal Audiences of Lima and Charcas, modern day Peru and Bolivia, roughly speaking. The native populations, who had adapted to a way of life suitable to the many microclimates throughout the Andes, experienced immense hardship in the transition to life in these new settlements. Despite the hardships, they preserved by their own agency aspects of native Andean culture and life in the reductions reflected a complex hybrid of forced Spanish values and those preserved from the older native communities.

== Background ==
Reducciones were not new to Latin America, and had been a Spanish policy in many other regions, starting in the Caribbean as early as 1503. From 1532 when Francisco Pizarro invaded the Inca empire until the arrival of Francisco de Toledo as Viceroy in 1569, Spanish rule of the Andean population had largely been indirect. Except for Roman Catholic priests, Spaniards were forbidden from living among the Indians and the Spanish extracted tribute and labor from the Andean population through their indigenous leaders, the caciques or kurakas. Although the Andean population was devastated by the internal wars of Spaniards and Incas, the ravages of European diseases, and forced, brutal labor in silver and mercury mines, the Andean Indian cultures remained in many ways little changed from the days when the Incas ruled.

By the late 1560s, Spanish rule of the Andes was in crisis. Both Spanish residents and Indians threatened revolt, production from rich silver mines had declined, the diminishing Indian population meant less labor and tribute, and civil and religious authorities were in conflict. The new Viceroy Francisco de Toledo aimed to reverse the fortunes of Spanish rule in the Andes and to "aggrandize Spanish power by consolidating viceregal rule and to revive the flow of Andean silver to the metropolitan treasury." In order to achieve these economic and political goals efficiently, one of the measures Toledo proposed was to relocate the scattered indigenous populations of the Andes into larger settlements, called "reductions."

Early in his assessment of the Andean region, Francisco de Toledo idealized a universal resettlement to transform Andeans “from savages to men and from barbarians to civilized people.” The campaign that took place in the Andes was part of the larger reforms he had been conceptualizing since 1567 and consulting about with Spanish authorities. Toledo himself conducted a massive inspection of the Andean heartland from 1570 to 1575 and brought the entire viceregal court on the journey. Trekking through mountains in the central and southern highlands, he took detailed observations to legitimize his plan and motivated the inspectors and administrators of the project. The selection of “appropriate” sites for the reducciones usually fell within “areas of proven or potential economic benefit to the Crown”, which was often near mining zones and agricultural valleys. Toledo also developed an immense and thorough body of rules that would set the framework for the colonial ambition of reorganizing Andean society.

=== Purpose ===
Before the construction of the relocation towns, indigenous peoples throughout the Andes lived in small, localized and dispersed villages, which were difficult for Spanish colonial authorities to oversee. A primary motivation for the massive resettlement program "was to establish direct state control and facilitate the church's Christianization of the native population, while enhancing the collection of the tribute tax and the allocation of labor."

Toledo further justified the reducciones under the theory that they would protect natives from “being exploited by local landowners and miners, harassed by the colonial judicial system, and deceived by a false religion.” Such paternalistic attitudes were common among Spanish authorities who perceived indigenous groups as volatile and prone to lawlessness if not placed under strict administration. In the later-published Comentarios Reales de los Incas, Inca Garcilaso de la Vega uses the same term "reducciones" to designate the villages conquered by the Incas which were loyal to the Inca empire.

=== Organization ===
Many Spaniards viewed Christianity as an inseparable component of town building in the colonial era, believing that it was necessary for the proper functioning of civilized urban life. This was based around the concept of policia, which portrayed an idealized civic life that extolled cleanliness, strict organization, and virtuous citizenship. Reducciones were, in large part, conceived within this philosophy.

The structural layout of the reducciones was based on a common template, modeled after a Spanish-style rural town. Each settlement was built with a quadrilateral, uniform street grid. Each reducción had a town square, around which were arranged the chief buildings: a church with an assigned priest, a prison, and a travelers lodge. They can best be described as a type of camp designed to model an ordered town.

Special governors, under the titles of corregidores de indios, were appointed to oversee the reducciones and were vested with authority. They were instructed to create cabildos (municipal councils) in the reducciones of common natives who were recruited from the general population. The effort to recruit commoners was meant to undermine the influence of caciques, the indigenous lords who still possessed power in Andean societies. However, many caciques used their knowledge and social capital as leverage against the corregidores, which made reducción governance less simple than Spanish authorities assumed. Though the caciques almost universally opposed the policy of resettlement, many of them took advantage of the opportunity to transition their positions of power into the reducciones and actively challenge Spanish authority.

== Impact on indigenous people ==
The movement into the reductions was highly disruptive on indigenous societies. Traditional family and kinship ties that existed for centuries were disturbed as small villages were forced to consolidate into poorly organized and often oversized settlements. This different living environment forced natives to acclimate to a new socioeconomic order in which their power was severely curbed by the violent coercion of Spanish forces.

Felipe Guaman Poma de Ayala, an indigenous chronicler in the early 17th century, recounts the changes due to the reductions in The First New Chronicle and Good Government. He notes that the local Andean agricultural system thrived based on plots cultivated according to the microclimates up and down the Andean mountain range. Each microclimate and corresponding agricultural product contributed to the health and overall well-being of the Native American population. However, the reductions destroyed this "'vertical organization of farming.'"

The people were torn from their established agricultural system and crops, and their familiar villages, and they were often relocated to different climate zones, requiring new crops and techniques. Poma also notes that the new sites were "sometimes set in damp lands that cause pestilence" (disease).

Despite the exploitation and hardships that Andeans faced, many found ways to exercise their agency where opportunity presented itself. Poma took special pride in the cabildos (municipal councils), composed of natives in each reduction, and saw them as a path towards developing indigenous self-government. In addition, many Andeans were able to negotiate deals to keep all or some of their previous villages and farmland, which resulted in an ebb and flow of people from the reductions to the countryside. Some people managed to avoid Spanish detection and escape the reductions altogether to pursue radically different lives.

== See also ==
- Jesuit missions among the Guaraní
- Mainas missions
- Moravian Indians
- Praying Indians
- Mission Indians
- Catholic Church and the Age of Discovery
- Reductions
- São Miguel das Missões in Brazil
- Jesuit Asia missions
- Cargo system
- Spanish conquest of Guatemala
- List of Spanish missions
