= LGBTQ history in Peru =

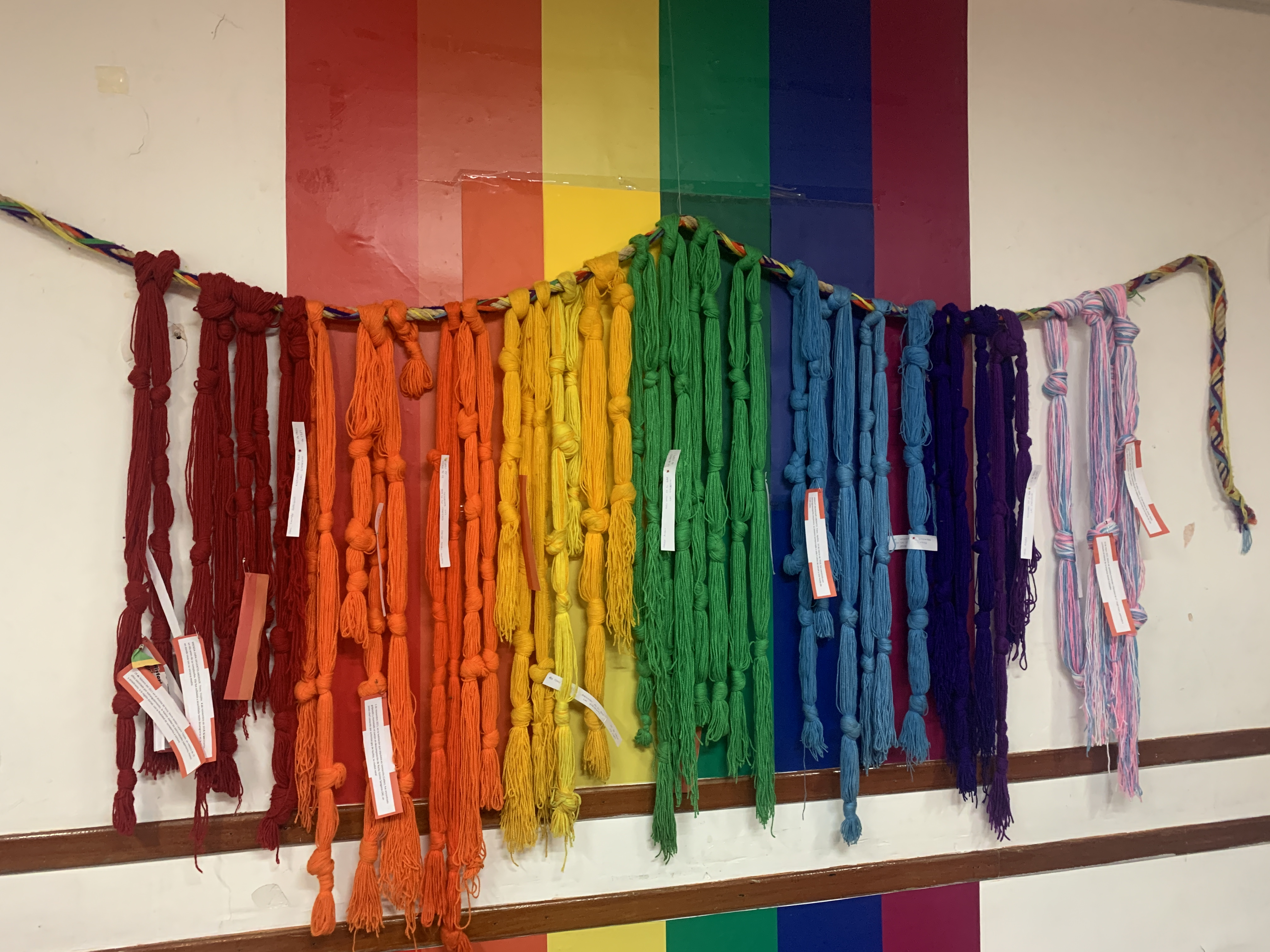
A rainbow-coloured quipu called Quipu de la Memoria LGBTI, 'Quipu of LGBTI Memory', representing the LGBTI community in modern Peru

LGBTQ history in Peru has had several unique features and events.

== Precolonial Era 100 – 1530 CE ==
In pre-Columbian times, different ethnic groups existed in Ancient Peru. Gender studies carried out for this period are scarce, and very little is known about pre-Columbian homosexual practices.

=== Moche culture ===
In the Moche culture, developed in northern Peru between 300 BCE. and the 700s CE, homosexuality would have been perceived normally, as attested by its ceramics. 40% of the ceramics (locally called huacos) represent homosexual relationships. Later, with the arrival of the Spanish conquistadors, many of these "huacos" were destroyed for being considered immoral, a practice that continued until the 20th century, this time by researchers and archaeologists, in an attempt to censorship and maintain an idealized vision of ancient Peruvian.

=== Inca Empire ===
According to the chronicler Pedro Cieza de León in Crónica del Perú, unlike the rest of the Inca Empire, the practice of homosexuality was tolerated in the north (Chinchaysuyo) and even considered an act of worship, with a male brothel existing that attended to the needs of the troop. These sexual servants were known as pampayruna.

Each temple or main shrine has a man, two or more depending on the idol, who are dressed as women, and with these, almost by way of sanctity and religion, the lords and principals have their carnal council.

— Crónica del Perú

Likewise, the Incas had special consideration for lesbians whom they called holjoshta. The Inca Capac Yupanqui used to have a very special affection for these women.

However, in the center and south of the empire the Incas severely punished homosexuality. The chronicler Martín de Murúa commented in his General History of Peru that the Inca Lloque Yupanqui punished "with great severity public sins - stealing, killing – and sodomy, for which he restrained, plucked his ears, pulled his nose and hanged him, and he cut the necks of the nobles and principals or tore their shirts.”

The Inca Garcilaso de la Vega relates in his Royal Commentaries of the Incas that homosexuality in the Inca Empire was prohibited and that "sodomites" were persecuted and burned alive.

They had found that there were some sodomites, not in all the valleys, but in each one, not in all the common neighbors, but in some individuals who secretly used that evil vice... The Inca was happy with the story of the conquest. ... And in particular he ordered that with great diligence an investigation be made of the sodomites and in a public square they would burn alive those who were found not only guilty but initiated, no matter how little... they would also burn their houses and tear them down to the ground and burn them. the trees of their estates, uprooting them... and they proclaimed by an unforgettable law that from then on they should guard against falling into such a crime, under penalty that for the sin of one, their entire town would be devastated and all its inhabitants in general burned.

— Comentarios reales de los incas

For his part, Cieza de León commented in his Chronicle of Peru that the Incas punished those who practiced homosexuality: "they hated those who used it, considering them as vile timid people and that if it was known to anyone that such a sin had committed, they punished him with such a penalty that it would be pointed out and known among everyone."

=== Aymara people ===
In the case of the Aymaras, who reside southwest of the Peruvian mountains, there are different opinions. According to the superstitions of certain sub-ethnic groups, they are also said to be an omen of bad luck. Although some communities have a certain degree of acceptance, respect and understanding of these people for their sexual orientation. In others, homosexuals were frequently considered special, magical beings, endowed with supernatural powers, recognized for their powers to be shamans.

== 16th to 20th century ==
Homosexuality in Peru was decriminalised in 1837.

== 21st century ==
Lesbian, gay, bisexual, transgender, and queer (LGBTQ) people in Peru face some legal challenges not experienced by non-LGBTQ residents. Same-sex sexual activity among consenting adults is legal. However, households headed by same-sex couples are not eligible for the same legal protections available to opposite-sex couples.

In January 2017, a decree issued by President Pedro Pablo Kuczynski took effect, prohibiting all forms of discrimination and hate crimes on the basis of sexual orientation and gender identity. In a landmark ruling published on 9 January 2017, the 7th Constitutional Court of Lima ruled in favor of recognizing and registering a same-sex marriage, between a Peruvian citizen and a Mexican citizen, performed in Mexico City in 2010. In March 2018, the ruling was reversed by the Supreme Court of Peru on procedural grounds.

Homosexuality has been used as grounds for separation or divorce in Peru. Laws meant to protect "public morals", such as Article 183 of the Penal Code on "obscene exhibitions and publications", have also been used against lesbians and gay people. Society's attitude towards homosexuals has generally been hostile and is still heavily influenced by the Catholic Church. The organisation Movimiento Homosexual de Lima (MHOL) was founded in 1982 to advocate for LGBTQ rights in the country. During the first Lima Pride parade in 2002, most demonstrators wore masks to avoid persecution.
