= Huaman =

Huaman (Quechua language, waman falcon^{[3]} or variable hawk^{[4]}) is a Quechuan surname.

It may refer to:

== People ==
- Felipe Huaman Poma de Ayala, Quechua-Peruvian nobleman and writer.
- Dr. Augusto Huaman Velasco, Peruvian physician and scientist.
- Benjamin Huaman de los Heros, Peruvian lawyer and politician. During the Oncenio de Leguía he was Minister of War (1922-1924), Minister of Finance and Trade (1924-1925), and Prime Minister (1929-1930). He was also a national deputy (1911-1918 and 1920–1925) and deputy of the National Constituent Assembly of 1919.
- Vilchez Huaman, the stage name adopted by Ricardo Wiesse Hamann, Peruvian solo musician and singer, former member of the tropical music duet/band La mente, also ex-member of Suda and Pura Purita.
- Liner “Pac-Man” Huaman, Peruvian boxer.
- Miky Joaquin Dipas Huaman, Peruvian politician and congressman for the Ayacucho region.
- Jorge Huaman, retired Peruvian footballer.
- Zoila Huaman, Peruvian female volleyball player.
- Paola Limo Huaman, Peruvian female model.
- Dr. Zosimo Huaman Cueva, Peruvian scientist and agronomist.

== Places ==
- Vilcas Huaman (Quechua language, sacred falcon), once a major Inca city of 40,000 people.
- Sacsay Huaman Fortress, once an Inca citadel complex, famous for its 5-story towers watching over Cusco, and for its megalithic walls which can be partially seen today.
- Santiago de Huaman, a town in Trujillo, Peru.
