= Túpac Huallpa =

First puppet Sapa Inca of the Inca Empire

Sapa Inca of the Inca Empire
- Reign: July 1533 – October 1533
- Installation: July 1533
- Predecessor: Atahualpa (as legitimate Sapa Inca of the Inca Empire)
- Successor: Manco Inca Yupanqui (as puppet Sapa Inca of the Inca Empire)
- Born: Before July 1533; Cusco, Inca Empire
- Died: October 1533; Jauja, Governorate of New Castile
- Quechua: Auqui Huallpa Túpac
- Dynasty: Hanan Qusqu ()
- Father: Huayna Cápac

Túpac Huallpa (alternatively Tupaq Wallpa or Huallpa Túpac); before July 1533 – October 1533), original name Awki Wallpa Túpaq, was the first vassal Sapa Inca installed by the Spanish conquistadors, during the Spanish conquest of the Inca Empire led by Francisco Pizarro.

== Life ==
Túpac Huallpa, born in Cusco, was a younger brother of Atahualpa and Huáscar. After Atahualpa's execution on 26 July 1533, the Spaniards appointed Túpac Huallpa as a puppet ruler and ensured he was crowned with great recognition and ceremony. All this was done to convince the Inca people that they were still being ruled by an Inca. Túpac died in Jauja during October 1533. He was succeeded by another brother, Manco Inca Yupanqui.

== Descendants ==
Túpac Huallpa was the father of at least six children:

- Francisco Huallpa Túpac Yupanqui;
- Beatriz Túpac Yupanqui, who married the conquistador Pedro Alvarez de Holguín de Ulloa (1490–1542), son of Pedro Alvarez de Golfín and his wife Constanza de Aldana, and had issue;
- Palla Chimpu Ocllo, baptized as Isabel Suárez Chimpu Ocllo, who married Sebastián Garcilaso de la Vega y Vargas, and was the mother of Inca Garcilaso de la Vega. After she was widowed, she married secondly Juan de Pedroche and had two daughters: one, Ana Ruíz, married her cousin Martín de Bustinza, and had issue, while the other, Luisa de Herrera, married Pedro Márquez de Galeoto, becoming the mother of Alonso Márquez de Figueroa;
- Leonor Yupanqui, who married Juan Ortiz de Zárate, and had issue;
- Catalina Pauccar Ocllo, From her union with the lineage of Pedro de Carbajal the Conquistador, her only daughter would later give rise to the branch of the Fernandez Cornejo from which figures such as President Piñera of Chile or Mario Vargas Llosa, among other notable characters, descend.
- Francisca Palla, who married the conquistador Juan Munoz de Collantes, born at The Palacio de la Alhambra, Granada, Spain. Together they had a daughter, called Mencia Munoz de Collantes Palla.

Regnal titles
Preceded by Atahualpa (last ruler of the Inca Empire)	Sapa Inca (as installed by the Spaniards); 1533	Succeeded by Manco Inca Yupanqui
