= Yapeyú =

The word Yapeyú comes from the Guarani language and means "ripe fruit".

- Yapeyú, Corrientes
- Yapeyú River now called Guaviraví River
- Yapeyú reduction, Jesuit missions among the Guaraní in Paraguay
