= Murder of Marco Antonio =

2009 murder in Peru

- Date: July 9, 2009
- Location: Lima, Peru
- Type: Homicide
- Deaths: 1

The murder of Marco Antonio, a Peruvian stylist, occurred on July 9, 2009, when three people, identified as Jorge Luis "Coco" Glenni Ponce (his then partner), Miguel Ángel "Pachón" Velásquez Zarazú and Jordan Antonio Pacheco Huamanchumo, tortured and murdered him in his apartment in the Lima district of San Isidro. According to the police investigation, the motive was the robbery of 15,000 U.S. dollars and valuables, but the case had national repercussions because he was a well-known homosexual figure.

== Marco Antonio ==
Marco Antonio Gallego Gonzáles
- Born: July 7, 1965
- Died: July 9, 2009 (aged 44)
- Cause of death: Homicide
- Occupations: Businessman and stylist

Marco Antonio Gallego Gonzáles was a Peruvian businessman and stylist, who rose to fame in the 2000s for being the fashion consultant for celebrities and models in the Peruvian entertainment world, popularly known as Chollywood. He was the director of the Marco Antonio hair salon chain, with branches in Lima and other Peruvian cities, such as Arequipa, Cusco and Trujillo. He also had his own fashion magazine called Belleza & Estilo. He participated in Peruvian television, hosting the entertainment show Hola a todos, alongside Katia Condos and Mathías Brivio. He was also the author of the book En mis manos está tu belleza, presented in Buenos Aires.

== Murder ==
Two days after celebrating his 44th birthday, Marco Antonio was in a room on the second floor of his apartment in San Isidro with Glenni Ponce, a 21-year-old former model and occasional partner of Antonio. Meanwhile, on the first floor, Velásquez Zarazú, 24, alias "Pachón," and Pacheco Huamanchumo, 19, alias "Jordan," stole his belongings in a coordinated operation with Glenni Ponce, who allegedly had a relationship with Marco Antonio. Hearing noises, Antonio went down to the first floor to see what was happening and discovered the robbery. He struggled with the thieves, who immobilized and beat him. They later murdered him.

When he did not show up the next day for the television program Hola a todos, which he hosted with Katia Condos and Mathías Brivio, his friends began to worry. Marco Antonio's body was found by police on July 10 in a prone position on the living room sofa, his torso naked, his hands and feet tied with a computer cable, and a black bag covering his head and a sports shirt gagged over his mouth. He had bruises and cuts all over his body, so the investigations by the Criminal Investigation Directorate (DIRINCRI) of the Police did not rule out that he was tortured before dying of asphyxiation. His body was taken to the Central Morgue of Lima for an autopsy.

On July 13, police arrested and interrogated Ponce for 20 hours. He confessed to the murder and provided authorities with information about the motive and other details, including the fact that each of the criminals received 4,500 sols for the stolen goods, which included five designer watches, two cell phones, clothing, and a laptop.

Marco Antonio was buried in the Campo Fe cemetery in Huachipa. The ceremony was attended by family and friends, such as Laura Borlini, Koky Belaunde, Edith Tapia, Cristian Suárez, Paula Marijuan, Claudia Portocarrero, and Carlos Cacho, who gave a farewell speech.

== Legal process ==
Until the trial concluded, both the police and the main defendants gave the press different versions and motives for the murder. Claims of what occurred included a robbery with violence, a crime of passion, or revenge after Glenni Ponce learned that Marco Antonio was supposedly HIV-positive. They were also linked to a crime that occurred on April 12, 2009, when two men murdered a friend of his, Puerto Rican stylist Roberto Izquierdo, in a similar manner and subsequently robbed him.

Following an investigation and changes in the versions of the cases handed down by those involved, the Transitional Criminal Chamber of the Supreme Court of Peru issued a ruling in September 2010. Glenni Ponce was sentenced to 34 years in prison; he avoided life imprisonment (applicable in cases of aggravated robbery under the Penal Code) by filing an appeal for early conclusion. In addition, a sum of 200,000 sols was fined as civil damages. Miguel Ángel Velásquez received a life sentence.

Years later, their sentence was revised. Glenni Ponce's sentence was increased to 35 years, Miguel Ángel Velásquez received 35 years for aggravated robbery, and Jordán Pacheco received 20 years in prison.

== See also ==
- LGBTQ history in Peru
