= The General History of Peru =

1617 book by Garcilaso de la Vega

Historia general del Perú
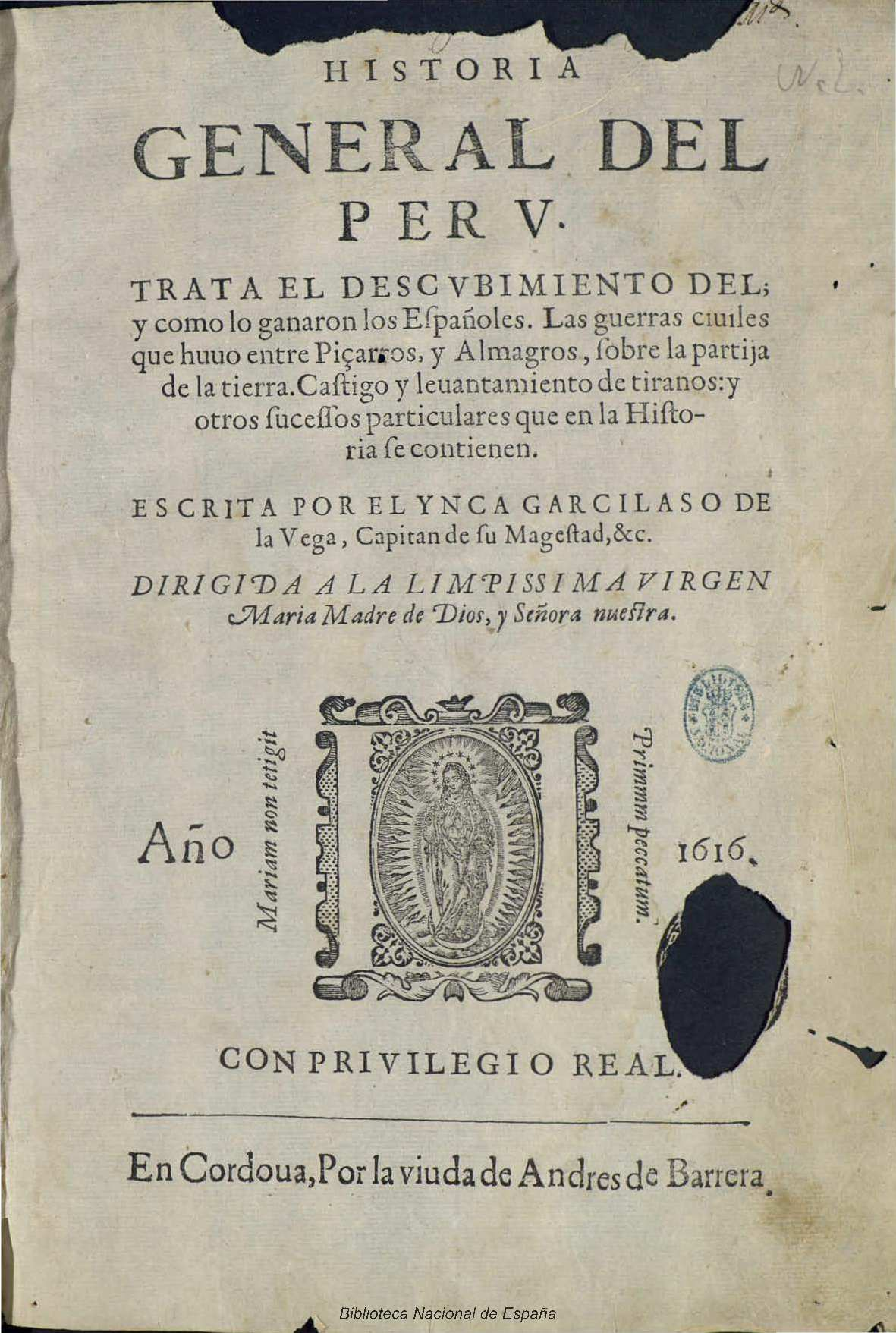
- Author: Inca Garcilaso de la Vega
- Publication date: 1617
- Publication place: Spain
- Preceded by: Comentarios reales de los incas

The Second part of the royal commentary (la Segunda parte de los comentarios reales) better known as the General history of Peru (La historia general del Perú), is a historical literary work written by Inca Garcilaso de la Vega, the first Peruvian and Spanish mestizo of intellectual renown. It was published in 1617, in Córdoba, Spain, a year after the death of its author, and was dedicated to the Virgin Mary. It is the continuation of the Comentarios reales de los incas, and was published in a crucial period of the history of Peru, which began with the arrival of the Spanish and ended with the execution of the final Inca of Vilcabamba, Túpac Amaru I, in 1572. Aside from the historical motive of the text, the author sought through this second part of his work to praise his Spanish heritage (his father having been a Spanish conquistador), as he had done with his indigenous heritage in the first part of his work (his mother having been a member of Incan royalty).

== Publication ==
The work was conceived by the author as the second part of his Comentarios Reales, which had been published in Lisbon in 1609. In this first part, the author discussed the culture and customs of the Incas and other peoples of Peru; in the second part, he discussed the Spanish conquest of the land and the establishment of a colony.

The manuscript of the Second part of the Royal Commentaries had been finished since 1613. The printing of the text was realised in the Cordoban printers of the widow of Andrés Barrera, but this work took significant time. As such, Garcilaso de la Vega was unable to see the publication of his work, dying on the 23rd of April 1616, at the age of 77. The following year, the book was sold under the name The General History of Peru (Historia General del Perú), a title which was arbitrarily chosen by the editor. The printing had been concluded since the previous year, since there exists an unusual exemplar from 1616. On the front-page, one can read the following text:

"The general history of Peru discusses its discovery, how the Spanish won it, the civil wars that occurred between Pizarros and Alamgros on the partition of the land, the punishment and risings of tyrants; and other particular events that are contained in the History. Written by the Inca Garcilaso de la Vega, Captain of his Majesty and dedicated to the Purest Virgin Mary, Mother of God and our lady. In Cordoba, by the widow of Andrés Barrera. In the year M. DC. XVII."

"Historia general del Perú, trata del descubrimiento de él, cómo lo ganaron los Españoles, las guerras civiles que hubo entre Pizarros y Almagros, sobre la partija de la tierra, castigo y levantamiento de tiranos; y otros sucesos particulares que en la Historia se contienen. Escrita por el Inca Garcilaso de la Vega, Capitán de Su Majestad y dirigida a la Limpísima Virgen María, Madre de Dios y Señora Nuestra. En Córdova, por la viuda de Andrés Barrera, . Año M. DC. XVII."

== Content ==
In this work, Garcilaso unpacks the conquest of Peru, the fights between conquistadors and the establishment of the Viceroyalty of Peru, as well as the resistance of the Incas of Vilcabamba, that culminated in the execution of the last of them, Túpac Amaru in 1572. The text also includes an attempt to rehabilitate the image of the author's father, the captain Sebastián Garcilaso de la Vega, who had fallen in the eyes of the crown for having served in the group of the rebel Gonzalo Pizarro.

== Sources ==
The sources were mostly oral testimonies by actors and witnesses to events (soldiers, captains, clergies, etc., as well as the author's own maternal and paternal sides of the family), as well as works by chroniclers such as Blas Valera, Pedro Cieza de León, Francisco López de Gómara, Agustín de Zárate, Diego Fernández de Palencia (El Palentino), as well as the author's own personal account of some of the events, complete with descriptions of places, customs, festivities and other facts of daily life.

== Aims of the work ==
If the first part of the Comentarios Reales aimed at portraying the Incas positively (the maternal ancestors of the author), the second part of the text (or the General History of Perú) contains a justification of Spanish conquest - within which the father of the author, the Spanish captain Sebastián Garcilaso de la Vega, was involved. In passing, the author defends the involvement of his father in the fights involving conquistadors, refuting thus the chronicler El Palentino, who in one of his works held that the captain Garcilaso had decidedly influenced the outcome of the battle of Huarina, within which the rebels Gonzalo Pizarro and Francisco de Carvajal rerouted the forces loyal to the king who were at the command of Diego Centeno. According to the chronicler, Garcilaso de la Vega's father had given his horse, named Salinillas, to the fugitive Pizarro, so that Pizarro could return to commanding his forces and change the course of the battle. Garcilaso de la Vega sought to dismantle this narrative, claiming that his father was made to join against his will the rebel group, and joined as soon as he good the forces of the more 'peace-making' Pedro de la Gasca.

The explicit aims of the author to "justify" Spanish conquest have allowed many scholars to characterise the author as a conformist and anti-indigenous. However, despite his expressions of loyalty to the Spanish crown and professions of Christian faith, Garcilaso de la Vega also used his work to underline the virtues and qualities of the Incas and the deficiencies and cruelties of the Spanish.

"To the indians, mestizos and criollos of the kingdoms and provinces of the great and very rich empire of Peru, the Inca Garcilaso de la Vega, your brother, compatriot and countryman, [wishes] health and happiness." In Spanish - "A los indios, mestizos y criollos de los reinos y provincias del grande y riquísimo Imperio del Perú, el Inca Garcilaso de la Vega, su hermano, compatriota y paisano, salud y felicidad".

— (Prologue of the "General History of Peru")
- Dedication of the Book (to the most glorious Virgin Mary).
- Prologue
- First Book (41 chapters).
- Second Book (40 chapters).
- Third Book (22 chapters).
- Fourth Book (42 chapters).
- Fifth Book (43 chapters).
- Sixth Book (29 chapters).
- Seventh Book (30 chapters).
- Eight Book (21 chapters).

In total, 8 books with 268 chapters.

== Editions ==
After the first edition of 1617, a second edition of the work appeared in Madrid in 1722.

Since the work centred on a controversial theme - that is, that of the Spanish conquest in America - this work was translated in other languages faster than the first part of the Commentaries had been. French, English and Flemish people were extremely interested in works of this style. This was translated into French by J. Baudoin (Paris, 1650). Other Parisian editions were produced in 1658, 1672, and 1830. An edition was published in Amsterdam in 1706, and extracts of the work were translated into English in 1625. The first complete London edition was published in 1688, alongside the first part of the Commentaries.

In Peru and America, the following editions were released (among others):

- Los Comentarios Reales de los Incas (1918-1920). This included both the first and the second part of the Commentaries, featuring annotations and agreements with the text by Horacio H. Urteaga, as well as the eulogy of Garcilaso by José de la Riva Agüero y Osma. Imprenta y Librería Sanmarti. Colección de Historiadores clásicos del Perú. 6 vls.
- Historia General del Perú (Segunda parte de los Comentarios Reales de los Incas, 1944). Edition of Ángel Rosenblat, del Instituto de Filología de la Universidad de Buenos Aires. Praise for the author and examination of the work by José de la Riva Agüero. Buenos Aires.
- Historia General del Perú (1959).Prologue by Aurelio Miró Quesada S. Librería Internacional del Perú S.A. – Peuser S.A. Lima – Buenos Aires. 2 volumes.
- Historia General del Perú; segunda parte de los Comentarios Reales (1962). Preliminary study and notes by José Durand. Lima, Universidad Nacional Mayor de San Marcos. 4 Volumes

== Bibliography and further reading ==
- Del Busto Duthurburu, José Antonio: La pacificación del Perú. Librería STUDIUM S.A., Lima, 1984.
- Inca Garcilaso de la Vega: Historia general del Perú o Segunda parte de los Comentarios Reales. Córdoba, 1617.
- Sánchez, Luis Alberto:
  - La literatura peruana. Derrotero para una historia cultural del Perú, tomo I. Cuarta edición y definitiva. Lima, P. L. Villanueva Editor, 1975.
  - La literatura en el virreynato. Incluida en Historia del Perú, Tomo VI. Perú Colonial. Lima, Editorial Mejía Baca, 1980. ISBN 84-499-1610-0
- Tamayo Vargas, Augusto: Literatura Peruana I, tercera edición. José Godard Editor, Lima, Perú.
- Garcilaso. Comentarios Reales de los Incas. Antología. Biblioteca Imprescindibles peruanos, Lima, Empresa Editora El Comercio S.A, 2010. ISBN 978-612-4069-45-1
- Chang-Rodríguez, Raquel: Franqueando fronteras: Garcilaso de la Vega y La Florida del Inca. Fondo Editorial PUCP, 2006. En Google Libros
