= Ocllo =

Ocllo may refer to:

- Mama Ocllo, the fertility goddess in Inca religion
- Palla Chimpu Ocllo (Isabel Suárez Chimpu Ocllo), an Inca princess
- 475 Ocllo, a small asteroid
