= Reductions =

Spanish colonial settlements for relocation and Christianization of Indigenous peoples

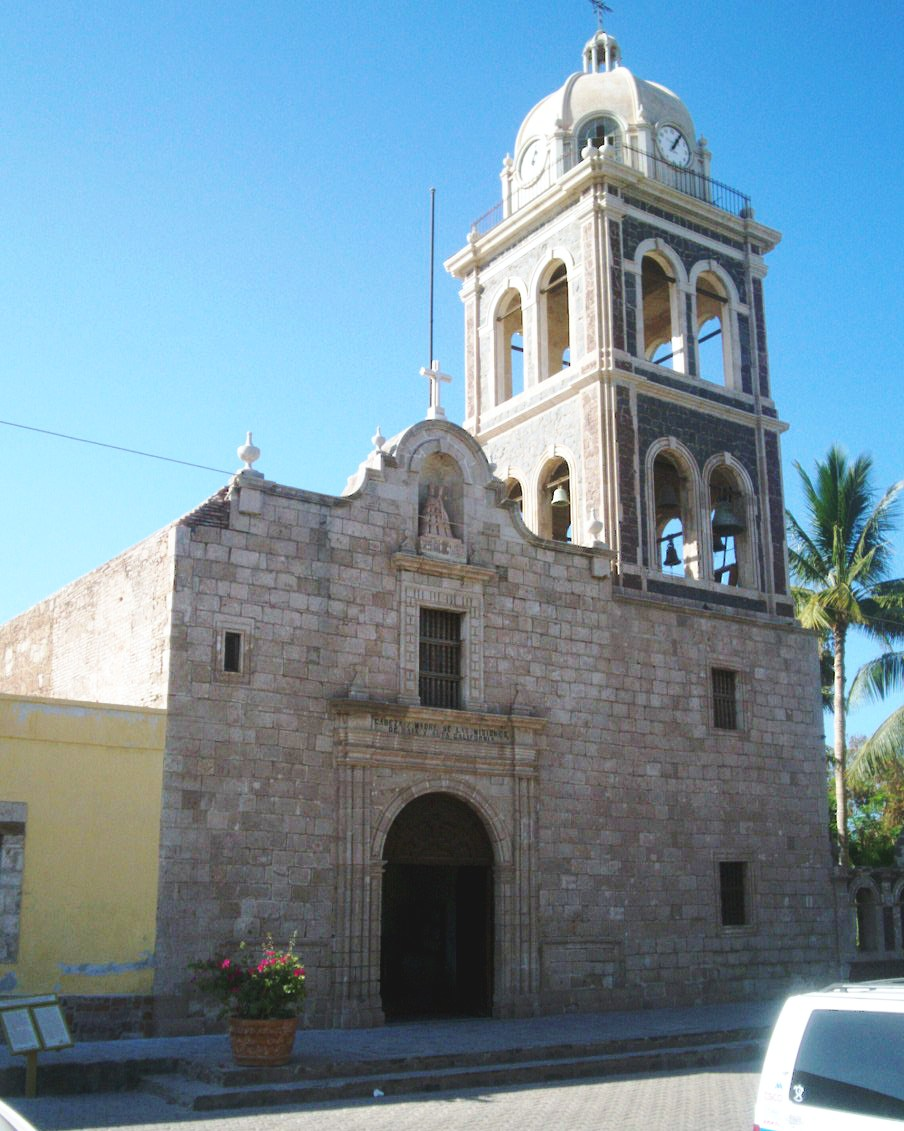
A church was always at the center of the reductions; this one is in Loreto, Baja California Sur.

Reductions (Spanish: reducciones, also called congregaciones) were settlements established by Spanish rulers and Roman Catholic missionaries in Spanish America and the Spanish East Indies (the Philippines). The Spanish relocated, forcibly in many cases, indigenous inhabitants (Indians or Indios) of their colonies into urban settlements modeled on those in Spain.

The Royal Spanish Academy defines reducción (reduction) as "a grouping into settlement of indigenous people for the purpose of evangelization and assimilation". In colonial Mexico, reductions were called "congregations" (congregaciones).

Forced resettlements aimed to concentrate indigenous people into communities, facilitating civil and religious control over populations. The concentration of the indigenous peoples into towns facilitated the organization and exploitation of their labor. The practice began during Spanish colonization in the Caribbean, relocating populations to be closer to Spanish settlements, often at a distance from their home territories, and likely facilitated the spread of disease. Reductions could be either religious, established and administered by an order of the Roman Catholic church (especially the Jesuits), or secular, under the control of Spanish governmental authorities. The best known, and most successful, of the religious reductions were those developed by the Jesuits in Paraguay and neighboring areas in the 17th century. The largest and most enduring secular reductions were those imposed on the highland people of the former Inca Empire of Peru during the rule of Viceroy Francisco de Toledo (1569–1581).

During the early stages of Christianisation of the Americas, Spanish Catholic authorities established on occasion ecclesiastical proto-parish subdivisions (doctrinas) for the indoctrination of the faith.

== Linguistic reducción ==
Linguistic scholars use the term reducido to describe the standardized colonial registers that emerged alongside settlement programs. In regions such as Yucatán, missionaries applied the logic of reducción to Indigenous languages, producing standardized rule‑governed varieties designed for catechesis, confession, and local administration. This process regularized grammar and orthography, introduced Christianized semantic categories, and promoted fixed syntactic patterns modeled on Latin and Spanish. The resulting forms (often referred to as reducido, meaning in this context "rightly ordered" or "civilized") circulated through grammars, dictionaries, sermons, and legal documents, becoming the dominant written register of the period. Examples include Maya reducido and Nahuatl reducido.

== Spanish West Indies ==
The policy of reductions was begun in 1503 by Spanish colonists on Caribbean islands. In the words of the Spanish rulers, "It is necessary that the Indians be assigned to towns in which they will live together and that they not remain or wander separated from each other in the backcountry." The Spanish ordered Indian villages to be destroyed and selected sites where new villages should be built. The concentration, or reducción of the Indian population, facilitated the Spaniards' access to Indian labor, the promulgation of Christianity, and the collection of taxes and tribute. Moreover, the reduction of the Indians was intended to break down ethnic and kinship ties and detribalize the residents to create a generic, pan-Indian population, disregarding their numerous tribes and different cultures.

== North America ==
The Spanish began creating reductions in Mexico shortly after Hernan Cortés's conquest in the 1520s. They were begun in Baja California in the 17th century and California in the late 18th century. Reductions in Mexico were more commonly known as congregaciones.

== South America ==
Indian reductions in the Andes, mostly in present-day Peru and Bolivia, began on a large scale in 1570 during the rule of Viceroy Francisco de Toledo. Toledo worked to remake the society of the former Inca Empire, with some success. Many new buildings were adapted from timber, stone, adobe, which connected new Spanish building forms with local materials, especially plazas, courtyards, and cathedrals. In a few years, he had resettled about 1.4 million Indians into 840 communities, many of which were the nuclei of present-day cities, towns, and villages.

Probably the most famous of the reductions were in the areas of present-day Paraguay and neighboring Argentina, Brazil, and Bolivia in the 17th and 18th centuries. These were created by the Jesuit order of the Catholic Church, governed by the Jesuits through indigenous chief-turned-governors. In the case of this Guaraní mission, the Jesuits aimed to make Christians of the Guaraní, impose European values and customs (which were regarded as essential to a Christian life), and isolate and protect the Guaraní from European colonists and slavers. After the territory of the Guarani was transferred to Portugal, forced expulsion by the Portuguese led to the so-called Guaraní War, with heavy losses for the Guaraní. The Portuguese colonizers also secured the expulsion of the Jesuits.

The Jesuits could not duplicate the success of the Guaraní mission in the Andes, on the Moxos, among the Chiquitos, or in the Chaco.

National and global suppression of the Society of Jesus put an end to the reduction system. Native wealth were sequestered by national authorities and the natives enslaved. According to David Brading, this was one of the factors for the Latin American Wars of Independence.

== Spanish East Indies ==
In the Spanish Philippines, the Spanish colonial government founded hundreds of towns and villages across the archipelago modeled on towns and villages in Spain. The authorities often adopted a policy of reductions for the resettlement of inhabitants from far-flung scattered barrios or barangays to move into a centralized cabecera (town/district capital), where a newly built church and an ayuntamiento (town hall) were situated. This allowed the government to defend, control and Christianize the indigenous population in scattered independent settlements, to conduct population counts, and to collect tributes. This enforced resettlement led to several revolts in the 17th century, often led by community shamans (babaylan). In some cases, entire villages would move deeper into island interiors to escape the reductions.

A similar policy was implemented in the nearby Mariana Islands during the Spanish–Chamorro Wars (1670–1699).

== See also ==
- Indian reductions in the Andes
- Internment – Imprisonment or confinement of groups of people without trial
- Yapeyú reduction
- Maya reducido
