= Felipe Guaman Poma de Ayala =

Quechua nobleman

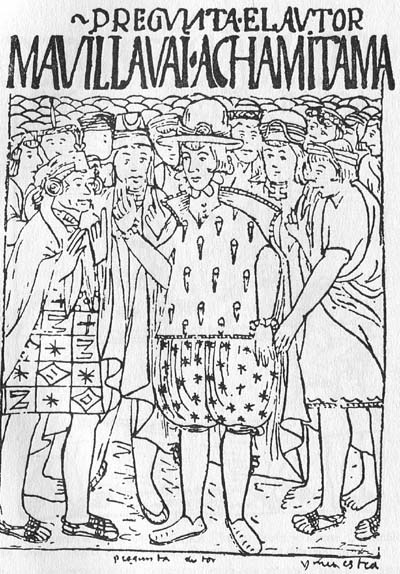
- Self-portrait of Felipe Guamán Poma de Ayala, who is listening to the relations and legends of the ancient Indians, who by their headdresses are distinguished as coming from several provinces and ranks
- Born: c. 1535; San Cristóbal de Suntuntu, Ayacucho
- Died: after 1616; Lima, Peru
- Occupation: Chronicler
- Notable work: El primer nueva corónica y buen gobierno

Felipe Guamán Poma de Ayala (c. 1535 – after 1616), also known as Huamán Poma or Waman Poma, was a Quechua nobleman known for chronicling and denouncing the ill treatment of the natives of the Andes by the Spanish Empire after their conquest of Peru. Today, Guaman Poma is noted for his illustrated chronicle, El primer nueva corónica y buen gobierno.

== Biography ==
The son of a noble family of the Indigenous (but non-Inca) Yarowilca dynasty of Guánuco in the north Peruvian cordillera, he was a direct descendant of the eminent Indigenous conqueror and ruler Huaman-Chava-Ayauca Yarovilca-Huanuco. Guaman Poma was a fluent speaker of several Quechua and Aru dialects, and probably learned the Spanish language as a child or adolescent. He went on to become literate in the language, although he did not achieve a perfect grasp of Spanish grammar. He described himself as being "eighty years of age" in his 1615 manuscript, leading many to deduce that he was born in the year 1535, after the 1533 Spanish conquest of Peru. The figure eighty may have been a metaphor for old age, and many other references in his text indicate a possible birth date of 1550 or shortly thereafter.

The information known about Guaman Poma's life comes from a variety of written sources. Most likely, he was born in the Lucanas province or and spent most of his life in or near Huamanga, a central Peruvian district. It is believed that the first time he left his hometown was when he served as an interpreter on the church inspection tour of a Spanish priest named Cristóbal de Albornoz, who was attempting to eliminate idolatry in the small Quechua towns. In the late 1580s to early 1590s, he was an assistant to Friar Martín de Murúa, another Spanish cleric. In 1594 he was employed by the Spanish judge of Huamanga who was in charge of land titles. In late 1600, however, all of his property was confiscated and he was banished from Huamanga, an event that led to his travels throughout the country and most likely to the composition of his masterpiece.

The Huamán family was wealthy within the Inca Empire, both before and after the conquest. As used to be common, marriages among the ruling families took place in order for them to maintain political control. At the time, the Huamán (Waman in Quechua, or Guamán in Spanish) were a family of warriors and landowners in several regions of the Inca Empire. They venerated the wild bird (similar to a falcon) that only lives in the highland regions of Peru, above 4,000 meters above sea level.

Guaman Poma was related to Inca royalty through three family lines: Tarco Huaman Inca, son of Inca Mayta Capac, cousin of Cápac Yupanqui, and grandson of Lloque Yupanqui; Huaman Achachi, brother of Tupac Inca Yupanqui; and Inca Huaman Taysi, son of Inca Roca. In 1570, landowner Don Antonio Huaman Cucho, in the city of Huamanga, declared ownership of several cities for the descendants of the Huamán family as an Inca descendant.

During the occupation by the conquerors, the Huamán family, being very extensive, were fiercely prosecuted, as the Spaniards feared the overthrow of the colonial government, the impeachment of the Hispanic occupation, and Indigenous land ownership claims. For this reason, most of their wealth in gold and ornaments was hidden and redistributed among their descendants. Most family members moved to different areas in Peru and Ecuador. The most prominent landowners were located in Pariamarca, Santiago de Huamán, Quito, and Huamanga.

There is a tradition that says that direct descendants from the line of the ruling Inca Huaman are protected and secretly maintained to be ready to take over the Peruvian Empire and re-impose the supremacy of order over chaos. There are tales among the Andeans that one day the "... Hawk will fly high, where the Sun surrenders ...". According to the mestizo writer Inca Garcilaso de la Vega, a waman is a type of hawk that can be found in the Andean region. See the Name section for more information.

== Chronicle ==
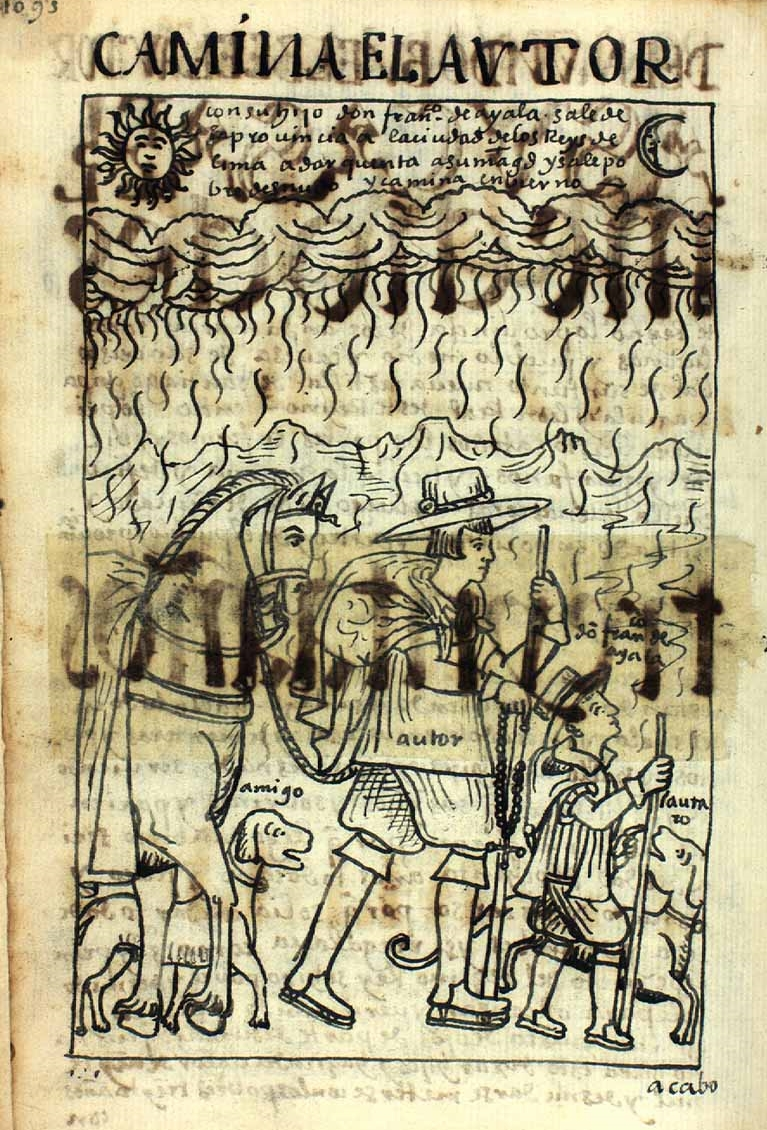
The author on his way to Lima (NC, p. 1105). The text reads: "Camina el avtor con su hijo don Francisco de Ayala. Sale de la prouincia a la ciudad de los Reys de Lima a dar qüenta a su Magestad. Y sale pobre, desnudo y camina enuierno...", (English: The author walks with his son, Don Francisco de Ayala. He leaves the province for the city of the Kings of Lima to report to His Majesty. And he leaves with no money, poorly dressed for walking in winter...). His dogs are identified in the drawing as Amigo ('friend') and Lautaro.

A handful of sixteenth-century documents attest that Guaman Poma served in the 1560s to 1570s as a Quechua translator for Friar Cristóbal de Albornoz in his campaign to eradicate the messianic apostasy, known as Taki Unquy, from the Christian doctrine of local believers.

Guaman Poma appeared as a plaintiff in a series of lawsuits from the late 1590s, in which he attempted to recover land and political title in the Chupas valley that he believed to be his by family right. These lawsuits ultimately proved disastrous for him; not only did he lose the suits, but in 1600 he was stripped of all his property and forced into exile from the towns which he had once ruled as a noble.

His great work was the Primer nueva corónica y buen gobierno (The First New Chronicle and Good Government), a 1,189-page document written largely in Spanish, with sections in Quechua. His book is the longest sustained critique of Spanish colonial rule produced by an Indigenous subject in the entire colonial period. Written between 1600 and 1615 and addressed to King Philip III of Spain, the corónica (Note: Crónica in modern Spanish) outlines the injustices of colonial rule and argues that the Spanish were foreign settlers in Peru. "It is our country," he said, "because God has given it to us." The king never received the document.

The corónica is remarkable in many ways. First, it combines writing and fine line drawings (398 pages of the book consist of Guaman Poma's full-page drawings). The work also includes his "Mapa Mundi de Reino de las Indias" (World Map of the Kingdom of the Indians), a cartographic representation of the Inca Empire drawn in the mappa mundi style favored by medieval European mapmakers, which placed Cusco, the ancient Inca capital, at the center of the world. Second, the manuscript expresses the view of a provincial noble on the conquest, whereas most other existing expressions of Indigenous views from the colonial era come from the nobility of Cusco. Third, the author frequently uses Quechua words and phrases in this primarily Spanish work, which provided material for scholars to learn more about Quechua.

Guaman Poma proposed a new direction for the governance of Peru: a "good government" that would draw from Inca social and economic structures, European technology, and Christian theology, adapted to the practical needs of the Andean peoples. He wrote that Indigenous governments treated their subjects far better than the Spaniards and pleaded with King Phillip to appoint Indians to positions of authority. Although he rejected Spanish rule, he did not reject the Spanish king. During that time, monarchs were typically seen as descendants of God and being strongly Catholic, he held the Spanish monarch in high regard. In his writing, he not only proposed changes to society, but also sought to bring perceived injustices to the attention of the king, who Guaman Poma saw as the representative of God, and believed would not have allowed the injustices to occur had he known of them.

The original manuscript of the corónica has been kept in the Danish Royal Library since at least the early 1660s, though it only came into public view in 1908, when it was discovered by the German scholar Richard Pietschmann. After many aborted facsimile projects, a heavily retouched facsimile edition was produced in Paris in 1936, by Paul Rivet. In 1980, a critical transcription of the book, based on an in-person inspection of the manuscript rather than on the 1936 facsimile, was published by John Murra and Rolena Adorno (with contributions by Jorge Urioste) as Felipe Guaman Poma de Ayala, Nueva crónica y buen gobierno. A high-quality digital facsimile of the original manuscript was published online in 2001 by the Danish Royal Library, with Rolena Adorno as scholarly editor.

== Relationship with Martín de Murúa ==
Twentieth-century scholars had often speculated that there was some relationship between Guaman Poma's corónica and Fray Martín de Murúa's Historia general del Piru (General History of Peru, 1616), assuming that Guaman Poma served as an informant or coauthor to Murúa. In 1967, Condarco Morales compared the texts and concluded that he followed Murúa's work. A direct relationship between him and Murúa was confirmed in 2007–2008 by a project at the Getty Research Institute. The project's principal scholars included Juan de Ossio, Thomas Cummins, and Barbara Anderson, with collaboration by Rolena Adorno and Ivan Boserup. After comparing the two existing manuscripts of Historia general del Piru (one owned by the Getty and the other by a private collector in Ireland), these scholars proved that Murúa's chronicle includes illustrations by Guaman Poma. They concluded that he was one of a team of scribes and artists who worked for Murúa. While Murúa's project began sometime in the 1580s, Guaman Poma became involved only as an illustrator and only shortly before 1600. Still, his contribution to Historia general del Piru is very significant. These findings were the basis of an exhibition and symposium at the Getty Center in October 2008.

Guaman Poma notably attacks Murúa in his corónica, including depicting the friar's striking and kicking an Indigenous woman seated at a loom. The depiction is entitled "The Mercenary friar Murúa abuses his parishioners and takes justice into his own hands." According to Adorno, "... when he became an author, after 1600, [Guaman Poma] was highly critical of a work by Murúa that he had recently illustrated. Guaman Poma was prompted to write his own account against what he understood to be Murúa's limited perspective, which he had encountered in the original manuscript of Historia general del Piru."

Guaman Poma wrote about Andean history back to the era predating the Incas. He also elaborated a long and highly critical survey of colonial society, unique among other manuscripts of the era. His artistic range, displayed in his nearly 400 drawings, was based on his experience gained while working with Murúa, but it also developed in new directions. He revealed a strong polemical and satirical bent that he directed against colonial abuses. "Although the evidence suggests that they worked independently after 1600, the efforts of Murúa and Guaman Poma can never be separated, and their talents, individually and together, produced three distinctive testimonies to the interaction between missionary author and indigenous artist-cum-author in early colonial Peru."

== Name ==
Guaman means 'falcon' in Quechua, and represented a "supreme existence" in the Inca society of his time. Someone with the "designation" of a falcon had the highest esteem among the Inca and preceding cultures. Poma meant 'puma' in the Quechua dialect. In modern Quechuan orthography, it would be spelled Waman Puma. Other variants include Waman Poma, Huamán Poma, and Guamán Poma (the latter two with a Spanish accent; the stress in Quechua is on the first syllable). In his own writing, he signed with his Quechua name between his Spanish baptismal name, Felipe (or Phelipe as he spelled it) and the family name of a Spanish conquistador connected to his family history, Luis Ávalos de Ayala. Guaman Poma writes about the symbolism of all his names in his book. He seemed to consider the form of his name to be a statement that his Quechua identity remained at his core, despite being surrounded by Spanish names.

== Posterity ==
Several pages of Guamán Poma's work were appropriated in the four large drawings on canvas with polychrome frames (¡Traga!, ¡Corre!, ¡Sopla!, ¡Muere!) made in 1992 by the painter Herman Braun-Vega for his Madrid retrospective on the occasion of the fifth centenary of the discovery of America by Christopher Columbus. With the transfers of press clippings combined with drawings by Guamán Poma and engravings by Goya, Herman Braun-Vega highlights the suffering of civilians, eternal victims of wars. Braun-Vega again references Guamán Poma's drawings in his painting El poder se nutre de dogmas (Velázquez, Guaman Poma de Ayala, El Greco, Goya), this time to highlight the Church's role in the Spanish conquest through the evangelization of Peru's indigenous people.

== See also ==
- Martín de Murúa
- Inca Garcilaso de la Vega
- Taki Unquy
- Augusto Huaman Velasco
- Huaman
- Blas Valera
- List of chroniclers of the Indies
