= Comentarios Reales de los Incas =

Book by Inca Garcilaso de la Vega

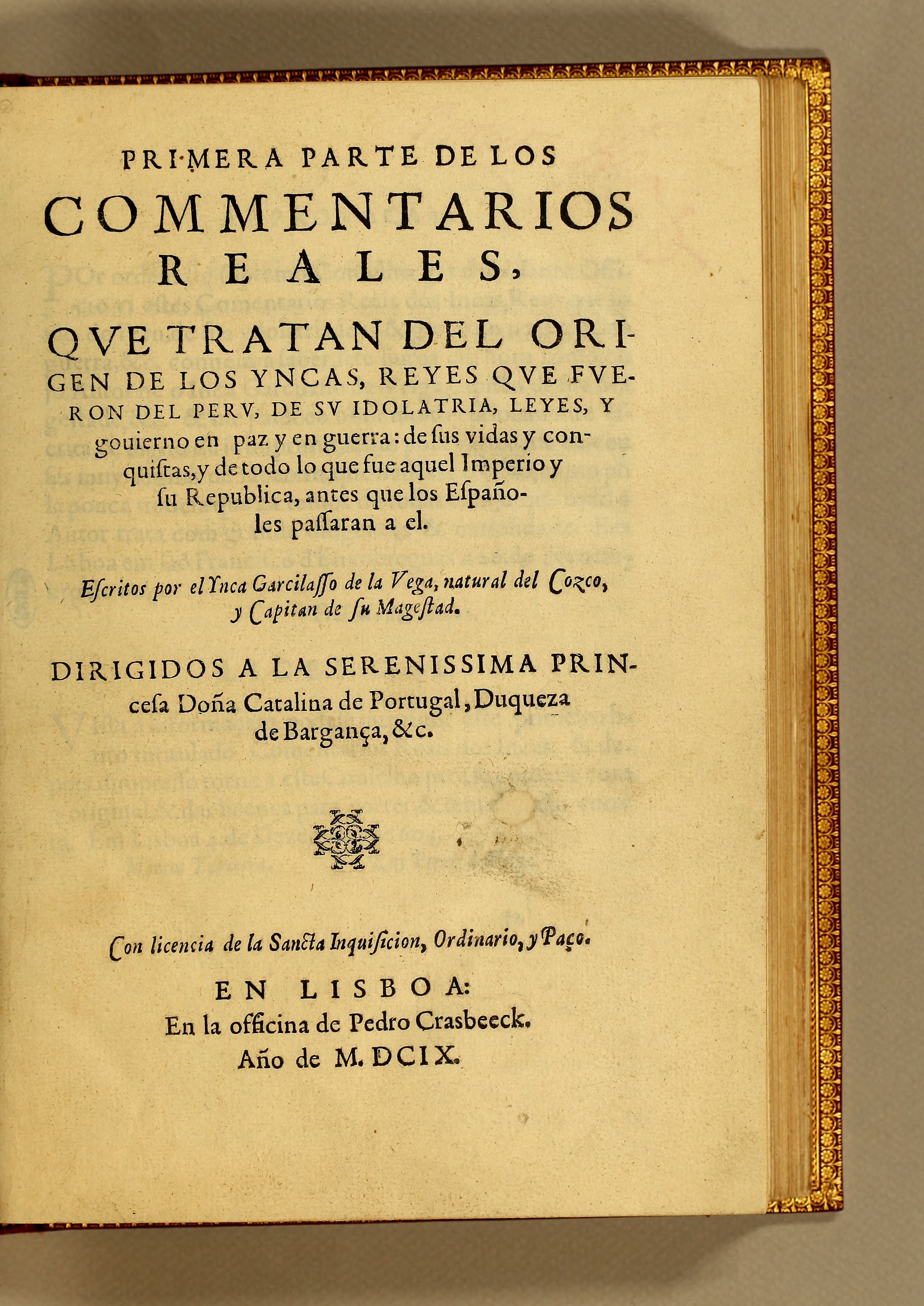
- Title page of Comentarios Reales de los Incas (1609)
- Author: Inca Garcilaso de la Vega
- Original title: Comentarios Reales de los Incas
- Language: Early Modern Spanish
- Genre: Chronicle
- Publisher: Pedro Crasbeeck
- Publication date: 1609 (Part One); 1617 (Part Two)
- Publication place: Habsburg Spain
- English publication date: 1688 (Part One and Two)
- Media type: Print
- Dewey Decimal: 860
- LC Class: F3442
- Original text: Comentarios Reales de los Incas at Spanish Wikisource

The Comentarios Reales de los Incas is a book written by Inca Garcilaso de la Vega, the first published mestizo writer of colonial Andean South America. The Comentarios Reales de los Incas is considered by most to be the unquestioned masterpiece of Inca Garcilaso de la Vega, born of the first generation after the Spanish conquest.

== Background of the author ==
Garcilaso de la Vega, el Inca, was a direct descendant of the royal Inca rulers of pre-Hispanic Peru and had a Spanish father. He wrote the chronicles as a firsthand account of the Inca traditions and customs. He was born a few years after the initial Spanish conquest and grew up while warfare was still underway. He was formally educated within the Spanish system of his father and for the most part, "Garcilaso interpreted Inca and Andean religion from the European and Christian point of view that he had been taught to adopt from infancy, and that provided him with most of his historical and philosophical terminology."

The natural son of Captain Sebastián Garcilaso de la Vega y Vargas and the Inca ñusta (princess) Isabel Suárez Chimpu Ocllo (or Palla Chimpu Ocllo), he lived with his mother and her people until he was ten and was close to them until leaving Peru. He grew up in the worlds of both his parents, also living with his Spanish father as a youth. After traveling to Spain at the age of 21, he was informally educated there, where he lived the rest of his life.

Garcilaso had previously published a Spanish translation of the Dialogos de Amor and had written La Florida del Inca. That was an account of Hernando de Soto's expedition in Florida and was quite popular. Both works had earned him recognition as a writer.

== Viewpoint ==
Most experts agree the Comentarios Reales are a chronicle of the culture, economics, and politics of the Inca Empire, based on oral tradition as handed down to Garcilaso by relatives and other amauta (masters, wise ones) during his childhood and adolescence, as well as written sources, including the chronicle of Blas Valera.

Garcilaso's commentaries have to be understood as representing a mixed worldview of the empire. He wrote both as a member of the royal family of Cuzco and from the base of Spanish-Catholic theology.

== Chapters ==
The ten sections or books of the work have the following subject matter:

- Book 1. Origin of the Incas, Manco Capac, and the founding of Cuzco
- Book 2. Sinchi Roca and Lloque Yupanqui, administrative divisions of the Inca empire, science
- Book 3. Mayta Capac and Capac Yupanqui, bridge over the Apurimac river, temples of Cuzco and Titicaca
- Book 4. Inca Roca and Yahuar Huacac, virgins of the sun, revolt of the Chancas
- Book 5. Inca Viracocha, Inca laws and customs, land, taxation, labor, prediction of the arrival of the Spaniards
- Book 6. Inca Pachacutec, royal mansions and funerals, quipus, festival of the sun, religion, schools, subjugation of the Chimu
- Book 7. Inca Yupanqui, description of the royal city of Cuzco, Sacsahuaman fortress
- Book 8. Inca Tupac, conquest of Quito, exploits of Huayna Capac as a prince
- Book 9. Huayna Capac's life, rule, and death. Atahualpa made ruler of Quito, warning of arrival of the Spaniards. Huascar becomes ruler of Peru, civil war between Atahualpa and Huascar
- Book 10. Spanish conquest, Francisco Pizarro takes Atahualpa prisoner, execution of Huascar, Atahualpa's gold ransom to the Spaniards, trial and execution. Author's conclusions.

== Publication history ==
He wrote the account from memories of what he had learned in Peru from his mother's people and in his later years. The first edition was published in 1609 in Lisbon, Portugal, in the printshop of Pedro Crasbeeck.

The first part deals with Inca life, and the second part is about the Spanish conquest of Peru (1533-1572). The second part of the Comentarios was published posthumously, one year after the author's death, in 1617, under the title of Historia General del Peru.

More than 150 years later, when the native uprising led by Tupac Amaru II in 1758 gained momentum, Charles III of Spain banned the Comentarios from being published in Lima in Quechua because of its "dangerous" content. Copies circulated secretly, as the native people drew pride and inspiration from their Inca heritage.

The first English translation was by Sir Paul Rycaut in 1685, entitled The Royal Commentaries of Peru.

The book was not printed again in the Americas until 1918, but copies continued to be circulated. In 1961, an English translation by Maria Jolas, The Incas, was published. Another edition was published in 1965, and the work has continued to receive scholarly attention.

== Reprint ==
- Linkgua US, 2006, ISBN 84-96428-70-2
