= Martín de Murúa =

Spanish Mercedarian friar and missionary (c. 1525 – c. 1618)

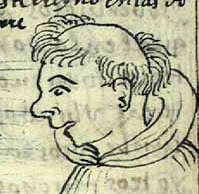
- Martín de Murúa by Guamán Poma de Ayala (1615)
- Born: 1525; Guipúzcoa, Spain
- Died: 1618 (aged 92–93); Madrid
- Occupation: Chronicler

Martín de Murúa, (c. 1525 in Gipuzkoa, Spain – c. 1618 in Spain) was a Basque Mercedarian friar and chronicler of the Spanish conquest of the Americas. He is primarily known for his work Historia general del Piru (written c. 1580-1616), which is considered the earliest illustrated history of Peru.

== Murúa's career in Peru ==
Murúa volunteered to serve in the missions of New Spain, where he was sent by his superiors and arrived in Peru in the early 1580s. He is known to have lived in the Curahuasi Valley around that period. He later traveled throughout the Viceroyalty of Peru as a missionary, serving in the proximities of Lake Titicaca and Cuzco, where he came to know some features of the inhabitants of the former Inca Empire well. From about 1595 to 1601 his residence was at the Mercedarian Monastery of St. John Lateran in Arequipa.

In addition to his missionary work, Murúa gathered data to write a history of the Andean past. He was assisted in his translation of the date from the Quechua language by a native Inca nobleman Felipe Guamán Poma de Ayala (also known as Guamán Poma), who provided over 100 illustrations of great historical significance for the work, but who was later highly critical of Murúa's depiction of Inca history in his own writings.

In 1611, Murúa made the decision to return to Spain. He chose, however, not to take the usual route, by way of Panama. Instead, he traveled across the Amazon Forest, crossing the Andes, arriving in La Plata (today Sucre). After a lengthy stay, from there he went on to Potosí and then to the Tucumán region. All along the way, he took the opportunity to have the local religious and government authorities review his work for comment and correction. He eventually passed through Córdoba and arrived in Buenos Aires, from which he set sail for Spain in 1615.

The following year, while living in Madrid, Murúa received the necessary authorizations from both his Order and the king to publish his chronicle, entitled Historia general del Piru. The work covers Peru's pre-Columbian and early Spanish colonial history. In his Historia, Murúa wrote of the presence of a number of mythological creatures in South America, such as Amazons and giants, which gave rise to the names of many geographical landmarks of the continent.

== The Galvin and Getty manuscripts ==
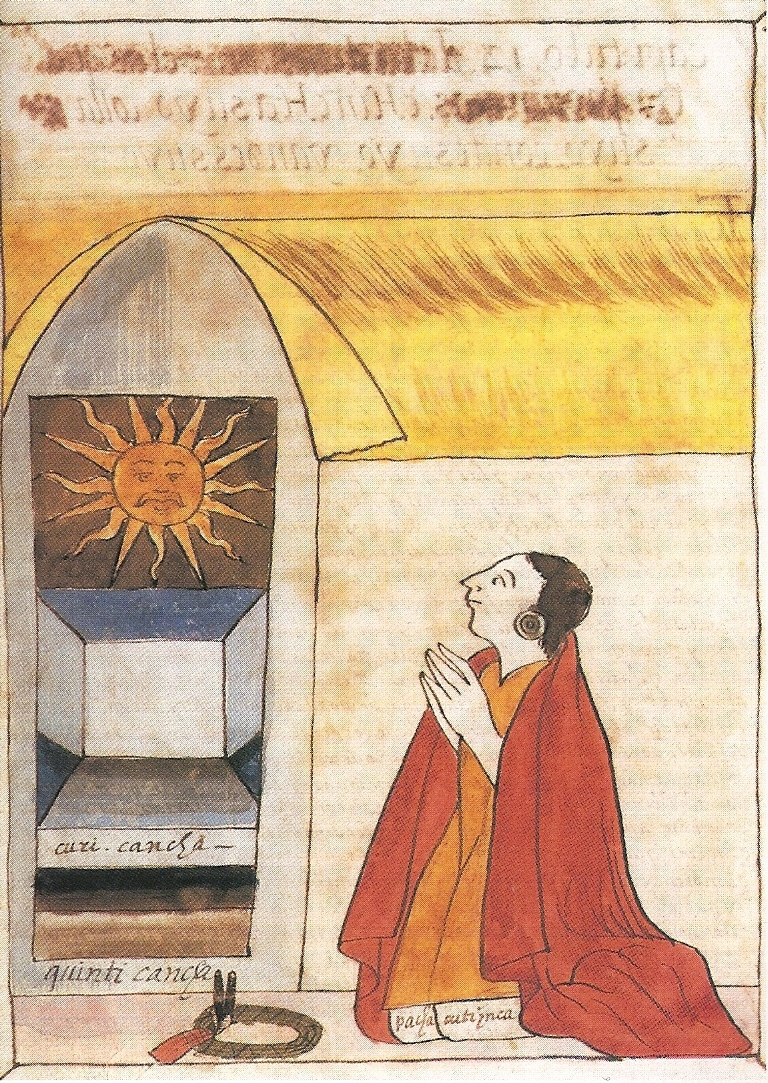
Murúa's image of the Sapa Inca Pachakutiq worshipping Inti (sun God) in the Coricancha, in his second chronicle, completed in 1613.

There exist two versions of the Historia general del Piru: the Galvin Murúa (also known as the "Loyola Murúa") and the Getty Murúa (also known as the "Wellington Murúa"). The former is kept in a private collection in Ireland while the latter is at the Getty Research Institute in Los Angeles, California. The original as well as a facsimile of the Galvin Murúa are available at the Getty Center for consultation by qualified scholars.

The Galvin Murúa dates from the 1580s and was completed around 1600. This first version of the chronicle was compiled in Peru by Murúa with the assistance of local scribes and Indigenous artists (one of whom was Felipe Guaman Poma de Ayala). By the 18th century, the Galvin Murúa ended up in the possession of the Jesuit College in Alcalá de Henares, Spain. Between 1879 and 1900, the manuscript was housed in a Jesuit enclave in Poyanne, France. Its association with the Jesuits gave the manuscript its title the "Loyola Murúa" (after St. Ignatius of Loyola, founder of the Jesuit Order). In the 1950s, the manuscript was bought by a rare bookseller in San Francisco, California and resold to the late John Galvin (d. 1996), a European aristocrat and private collector. The text remains in the hands of the Galvin family in County Meath, Ireland.

The Getty Murúa dates from 1615 to 1616 and was the second version of the chronicle. Most of the text was compiled in Peru and present-day Bolivia, although it was most likely re-edited in Spain. This version received the final approbation for printing, however for unknown reasons it remained unpublished during the seventeenth century. Once in Spain, the manuscript was somehow acquired by Castilian statesman and bibliophile Lorenzo Ramirez de Prado. After Ramirez's death in 1658, it was incorporated into the library of the Colegio Mayor de Cuenca in Salamanca and finally the private library of King Charles IV of Spain in 1802. As a result of the Peninsular War, it came into the possession of Arthur Wellesley, 1st Duke of Wellington. Thus the manuscript acquired the title the "Wellington Murúa." It was later sold at auction to a collector in Cologne, Germany, changing hands once more before its "rediscovery" by Manuel Ballesteros Gaibrois in the early 1950s. Ballesteros Gaibrois published a two volume edition of Historia general del Piru in 1962 and 1964. In 1983, the manuscript was sold to the Getty Research Institute. Since then it has been known as the "Getty Murúa."

Research has proven that several images (including two by Guaman Poma) from the Galvin Murúa were removed and pasted into the Getty Murúa, although overall the Galvin Murúa contains more images than its counterpart. The images in both manuscripts were colored using paints, dyes, and silver from the Americas and Europe. An exhaustive study of both manuscripts was funded by the Getty Research Institute in 2007–2008.

== Murúa's Historia general del Piru (1616) ==
Murúa's chronicle is divided into three books. The following is the complete title of the work:

Historia General del Pirú. Origen y descen
dencia de los Incas, donde se trata de las guerras
civiles Ingas como de la entrada de los españoles
Descripción de las ciudades y lugares del, con
otras cosas notables, compuesto por el Muy rdo.
Fr. Martín de Murúa, elector genl. del orden de nra. Sa
de las mds. Rra de captious, comor y cura de Hunata.

The first book is divided into 92 chapters and contains the following:

(I) Libro del Origen y descendencia de los
Ingas. Señores deste Reyno del Pirú donde se
ponen las conquistas que hizieron de differentes probinc
ias Y Naciones y Guerras civiles hasta la entra
da De los Españoles, con su modo de governar cond
ción y trato y la descripción de las más prinsi
pales Ciudades y Villas de
esta amplisima provincia.

The second book has 40 chapters and includes the following:

(II) Libro segundo, del gobierno que los Yngas
tubieron en este reino y ritos y ce
remonias que gardaban.

Finally, the third book contains the following in 31 chapters:

(III) Libro tersero, donde se trata, en
general, y particular deste reino
del Pirú, y las ciudades prins
ipales y villas.

Murúa worked closely with indigenous peoples in compiling his text, incorporating their testimonies and oral accounts of Inca culture and political history into Historia general del Piru. The most striking feature of the chronicle is its numerous illustrations, which include portraits of Inca nobility and depictions of traditional ceremonies. These images blend European and indigenous artistic traditions.

== Murúa and Guamán Poma ==
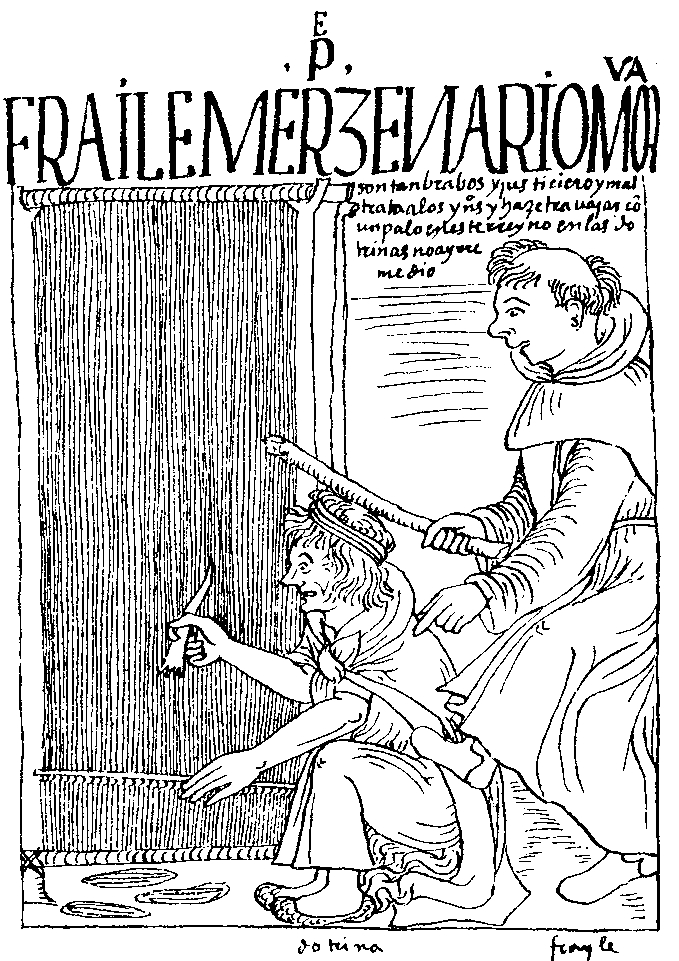
Drawing (ca. 1615) by Guamán Poma de Ayala depicting the friar Morúa beating a native worker. The superimposed legend says: FRAILE MERZENARIO MORVA. son tan bravos y justicieros y mal trata a los yndios y haze trauajar con un palo en este reyno en las dotrinas no ay rremedio. (MERCENARIAN FRIAR MORÚA. are so brave and righteous (righteous or avengers) and he mistreat the Indians and he make them work with a stick in this kingdom in the doctrines there is no remedy.), El primer nueva corónica y buen gobierno.

There is strong evidence that the chroniclers Guamán Poma and Martín de Murúa met and there was a close collaboration between them that later ended in rupture.

Twentieth-century scholars had often speculated that there existed some relationship between Guamán Poma's Nueva Corónica y Buen Gobierno and Friar Martín de Murúa's Historia general del Piru (1616), assuming that Guamán Poma served as an informant or coauthor to Murúa. In 1967, Condarco Morales performed a comparative study of the texts and concluded that Guamán Poma followed Murúa's work. A direct relationship between Guamán Poma and Murúa was confirmed by the Getty research project (2007–2008). The project's principal scholars included Juan de Ossio, Thomas Cummins, and Barbara Anderson, with collaboration by Rolena Adorno and Ivan Boserup. After comparing the Getty Murúa and Galvin Murúa, these scholars proved that the chronicle does in fact include illustrations by Guamán Poma. They concluded that Guamán Poma was one of a team of scribes and artists that worked for Murúa while he was in Peru. While Murúa's project began sometime in the 1580s, Guamán Poma became involved only as an illustrator and only shortly before 1600. These findings were the basis of an exhibition and symposium at the Getty Center in October 2008.

Guamán Poma notably attacks Murúa in his Corónica, even depicting the friar striking and kicking an indigenous woman seated at a loom. This image is entitled "The Mercedarian friar Martín de Murúa abuses his parishioners and takes justice into his own hands." According to Rolena Adorno, "... when he became an author after 1600, [Guamán Poma] was highly critical of a work by Murúa that he had recently illustrated. Guamán Poma was prompted to write his own account against what he understood to be Murúa's limited perspective, which he had encountered in the Galvin Murúa. Guamán Poma extended Andean history back in time of the era predating the Inca, and he also elaborated a long and highly critical survey of colonial society such as no other chronicle of his time produced. Guamán Poma's artistic repertoire, which was displayed in his own work in the creation of nearly four hundred drawings, drew upon the formative experience he had gained while working with Murúa, but it also developed in new directions to reveal a strong polemical and satirical bent that was directed against the abuses perpetrated under colonial rule ... Although the evidence suggests that they worked independently after 1600, the efforts of Murúa and Guamán Poma can never be separated, and their talents, individually and together, produced three distinctive testimonies to the interaction between missionary author and indigenous artist-cum-author in early colonial Peru."

== See also ==
- Guamán Poma
- Inca Garcilaso de la Vega
- Diego Fernández

== Citations ==
- 1. Rolena Adorno and Ivan Boserup, "The Making of Murúa's Historia General del Piru" in The Getty Murúa: Essays on the Making of Martin de Murúa's 'Historia General del Piru,' J. Paul Getty Museum Ms. Ludwig XIII 16. [Edited by Thomas Cummins and Barbara Anderson] (Los Angeles: Getty Research Institute, 2008)

== Works ==
- Historia de los Incas. Reyes del Perú .... Crónica del siglo XVI. Anotaciones y Concordancias con las crónicas de Indias. ed. por Horacio H. Urteaga y C. A. Romero. Colección de libros y documentos referentes a la historia del Perú. ser. 2, t. 4. Lima 1922-1925. (Historia del origen y genealogía real de los Reyes Incas del Perú. Introducción, notas y arreglos por Constantino Bayle. Biblioteca "Missionalia hispanica", vol. 2. Madrid 1946. Los Orígenes de los Inkas. Crónica sobre el Antiguo Perú escrita en el año 1590 por el padre mercedario Fray ... Estudio bio-bibliográfico sobre el autor por Raúl Porras Barrenechea. Los pequeños grandes libros de historia americana. ser. 1, t. 11. Lima 1946).
- Fábulas y Ritos de los Incas (1573). Pequeños Grandes Libros de Historia Americana, Serie 1, t. 4. Lima 1943.
- Fray Martín de Murúa: Historia general del Perú. Origen y descendencia de los Incas (1611). Introducción y notas de Manuel Ballesteros Gaibrois. Bibliotheca Americana vetus. Con prólogo del Duque de Wellington. 2 vols. Madrid 1962-64.
