= Blas Valera =

Jesuit priest and Inca nationalist in Peru (1544–1597)

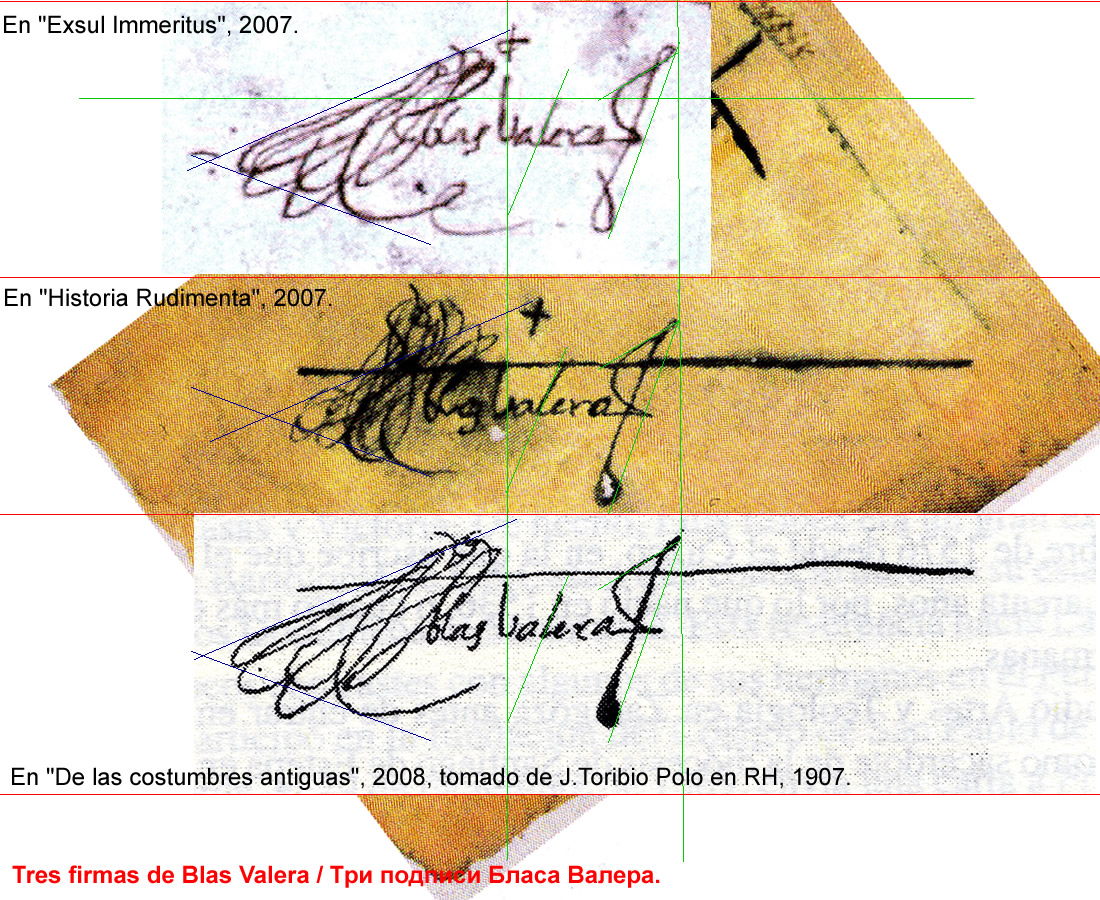
Three signatures of Blas Valera (private collection, C. Miccinelli - Naples (Italy))

Blas Valera (1544 – 1597) was a Roman Catholic priest of the Jesuit Order in Peru, a historian, and a linguist. The son of a Spaniard and an Andean woman, he was one of the first mestizo priests in Peru. He wrote a history of Peru titled Historia Occidentalis which is mostly lost, although the Inca Garcilaso de la Vega quoted some of it in his General History of Peru. In 1583 Valera was jailed by the Jesuits. The Jesuits claimed they were punishing Valera for sexual misconduct but more likely the reason was heresy. Valera's writings claimed the Incas were the legitimate rulers of Peru, the Incas' language, Quechua, was equal to Latin as the language of religion, and the Inca religion had prepared the Andean peoples for Christianity. In 1596, still under house arrest, he traveled to Spain. He died there in 1597.

In the words of biographer Sabine Hyland, Valera had "concern for the welfare of the indigenous people of Peru" and he made "courageous efforts to defend their civilization and forge a new vision of Andean Christianity."

== Life ==
Blas Valera was born in Chachapoyas, Peru, in 1544 or 1545, the out of wedlock son of Luis Valera, a conquistador of the Inca Empire, and Francisca Pérez, an Andean woman and possibly a member of the Inca royal family. As a child, Valera spoke Quechua and he studied Latin and Spanish in the city of Trujillo and became a competent linguist. His brother Jerónimo, eleven years younger, became a Franciscan theologian.

Valera joined the Jesuit Order in Lima in 1568 and was described as "humble" with a "stable personality and much practical wisdom." He spent about five years as a novice, and was among the first group of mestizos to be accepted by the Jesuits to study for the priesthood. The Jesuits, new in Peru, were encouraging the use of indigenous languages and cultures as means of spreading Christianity. In 1573, Valera was ordained as a priest and in 1576 he was a Latin teacher and preacher to the Andean (Indian) indigenous population in Cuzco. He became involved with a group of Inca noblemen in the Name of Jesus confraternity. The nobles in the Name of Jesus confraternity formed an alliance with the Jesuits to preserve their royal privileges and to promote the centrality of Cuzco and the Incas to the Catholic faith. In 1577, the Jesuits wished to transfer Valera and another priest, Father Barzana, to Potosí, but the Incas in Cuzco protested and his transfer was delayed until 1578 or 1579. In Potosí, he apparently founded a Name of Jesus confraternity.

In 1582 and 1583, Valera worked in Lima. With other priests, he translated the Roman Catholic catechism into Quechua and Aymara. However, he ran afoul of European-born Jesuits when he claimed that the Inca religion was compatible with Christianity and that Quechua terms could be used to describe Christian doctrine. The unorthodox views of Valera and other mestizo priests led in 1582 to the Jesuits' ban of mestizos from the priesthood. Shortly after the ban, Valera was imprisoned by the Jesuits. The Jesuits sentenced him to four years imprisonment and six years of house arrest. He was permanently stripped of his priestly duties and prohibited from teaching languages. In prison, Valera was forced to pray, perform menial tasks, and undergo weekly "mortifications," which probably included flagellations. Valera was given the opportunity to join another religious society but he declined, saying that he was innocent.

Although the ostensible reason for Valera's imprisonment was sexual indiscretions, his punishment was far more severe than that of other priests accused of the same offense. The more likely reason for his imprisonment was his view that the Incas were the proper rulers of Peru and that Quechua was superior to Spanish and equivalent to Latin as a language of religion. An air of secrecy characterized his incarceration. His punishment was not dictated by the usual means of a trial by the Inquisition. Instead, the matter was referred to Jesuit leadership in Europe. On 11 April 1583 Father Andrés Lopez left Peru for Spain. One of his tasks was to advocate in person that Valera be dismissed from the Jesuit Order. The details of Valera's offense were too secret to be put in writing by the Jesuits. Author Hyland speculates that the Jesuits wished to avoid antagonizing Philip II of Spain and suppressed Valera's opinions.

Valera had run afoul of a Spanish policy established under Viceroy Francisco de Toledo (ruled 1569–1581) to emphasize the legitimacy of Spanish rule and denigrate the Incas, especially their religion. Prior to Toledo's rule, the indigenous culture of Peru had mostly survived the 40 years since Francisco Pizzaro's overthrow of the Inca Empire. Toledo initiated a massive reorganization of indigenous society. Valera's defense of the Incas and their culture and religion was contrary to Toledo's objectives. The semi-assimilated mestizos, including mestizo priests, were an obstacle to the obliteration of indigenous culture desired by Toledo and subsequent Viceroys.

Valera requested to go to Rome to plead his case with Jesuit leader Claudio Acquaviva. He left Peru in 1594, but spent two years in Quito recovering from illness. He finally arrived in Spain in May 1596 where he was initially imprisoned but, on 3 June 1576, Father Cristóbal Mendez wrote to Acquaviva that Valera had reformed. He was permitted to teach humanities in Cádiz, but not languages or to hear confessions. Later that year Valera was injured during the sacking of Cádiz by an Anglo-Dutch Fleet. He died on 2 April 1597.

== Disputed claims ==
In the 1980s and 1990s an Italian woman, Clara Miccinelli, announced that she had found 17th century documents proving that Valera did not die in 1597 but rather returned to Peru and became the real author, instead of Guaman Poma, of a lengthy chronicle describing Spanish misrule of Peru. The documents also claim that the quipus (knotted strings) of the Inca were a true "written" language rather than just a recording device and that Pizarro used poison to defeat and overthrow the Incas. Experts have questioned the authenticity of the documents. Author Hyland believes the documents are probably authentic and date from the 17th century, but that the claims in the documents are fictional and incorrect. She says that the documents may represent the views of some 17th century Jesuits critical of Spanish rule.

== Works ==
Valera was the author of four known works. Most of his writings are lost, but their character can be ascertained through their use as sources by other authors. His first known work written in 1579 or earlier was a history of the spread of Christianity among the indigenous people of the Andes. The second was a lengthy history of the Incas which was mostly destroyed in the sacking of Cádiz in 1596. The parts that survived were cited and quoted by, among others, Inca Garcilaso de la Vega in his Comentarios Reales de los Incas published in 1609. Garcilaso said that Valera's Latin was "elegant." Valera also wrote a Quechua Vocabulary which was more like an encyclopedia. He expressed his admiration for the Inca Emperor Atahuallpa who he said was a Christian saint in heaven. The "Vocabulario" was a source, sometimes not attributed due to Valera's poor standing with the Jesuits, for Giovanni Anello Oliva in his histories of the Incas. The fourth work, and the only one which is known to exist in its entirety is "An Account of the Ancient Customs of Peruvian Natives." Most of the "Account" describes the religion of the Incas in highly favorable terms, apparently to counter negative descriptions of Inca religion by other writers. It was written by Valera while he was recuperating from illness in Quito in 1594 and 1595.

== See also ==
- List of chroniclers of the Indies

== Sources ==
- Hyland, Sabine. The Jesuit & the Incas: The Extraordinary Life of Padre Blas Valera, S.J. (The University of Michigan Press: Ann Arbor, Michigan) 2003.
