= Chimpu Ocllo =

- Incan noble
- Born: ca. 1523; Cuzco (capital city), Inca Empire
- Died: 1571; Cuzco, Viceroyalty of Peru
- Spouse: 1. Sebastián Garcilaso de la Vega y Vargas (partner); 2. Juan del Pedroche (husband)
- Issue: Inca Garcilaso de la Vega; Luisa de Herrera y Pedroche; Ana Ruiz de Pedroche
Names
- Isabel Suárez Yupanqui
- House: Inca royal house
- Dynasty: Hanan Cuzco
- Father: Túpac Huallpa
- Mother: Tocto Coca
- Religion: Inca religion
- Occupation: Ñusta

Isabel Suárez Yupanqui, born as Palla Chimpu Ocllo (1523-1571), was a princess of the Inca Empire. She was born to Sapa Inca Túpac Huallpa (r. 1533).

She lived with Sebastián Garcilaso de la Vega y Vargas, a Spanish colonial official. They did not even speak one another's language, however in 1539 they had a son, Inca Garcilaso de la Vega.

In 1551, de la Vega y Vargas married a Spanish woman, and put Ocllo aside. He arranged for her to be married to a lower-ranked Spaniard, Juan del Pedroche. She and de Pedroche had two daughters: one, Ana Ruíz, married her cousin Martín de Bustinza, and had issue, while the other, Luisa de Herrera, married Pedro Márquez de Galeoto, becoming the mother of Alonso Márquez de Figueroa.
