= Yapeyú reduction =

The reducción de Nuestra Señora de los Santos Reyes de Yapeyú (Our lady of the Holy Kings of Yapeyú) (1627) was one of the Jesuit missions among the Guaraní in the Jesuit province of Paraguay in the Spanish Empire. The mission was founded on the right bank of the Uruguay River, a 29°28′15.9959″S 56°49′2.2799″W, a location which is today known as Yapeyú, in Corrientes Province, Argentina. It is also known as the town of Yapeyú and is linked to the "Gran estancia de Yapeyú" (Great Estate of Yapeyú), which today includes borderlands of three countries: Argentina, Brasil and Uruguay.

When the Jesuits were expelled from South America in 1768, control of the area passed to the Dominican Order, and local government was secularized. The reduction system ended in 1810 with the Primera Junta, which established equality between peoples of Indigenous, Creole, and European ancestries. The town of Yapeyú was involved in civil wars and wars with Portugal, resulting in its complete destruction in 1817.
