= Diego Fernández de Palencia =

Spanish explorer c. 1520–c. 1581)

Diego Fernández de Palencia (c. 1520 – c. 1581), called El Palentino, was a Spanish adventurer and historian of the 16th century.

Born at Palencia, he was educated for the church, but about 1545 he embarked for Peru, where he served in the royal army under Alonzo de Alvarado. Andres Hurtado de Mendoza, marquess of Cañete, who became viceroy of Peru in 1555, bestowed on Fernandez the office of chronicler of Peru; and in this capacity he wrote a narrative of the insurrection of Francisco Hernandez Giron, of the rebellion of Gonzalo Pizarro, and of the administration of Pedro de la Gasca. The whole work, under the title Primera y segunda parte de la Historia del Piru, was published at Seville in 1571 and was dedicated to King Philip II. It is written in a clear and intelligible style, and with more art than is usual in the compositions of the time. It gives copious details, and, as he had access to the correspondence and official documents of the Spanish leaders, it is, although necessarily possessing bias, the fullest and most authentic record existing of the events it relates.

A notice of the work will be found in William H. Prescott's History of the Conquest of Peru (new ed., London, 1902).

== See also ==
- Inca Garcilaso de la Vega
- Fray Martín de Murúa
