= El primer nueva corónica y buen gobierno =

Peruvian 17th century chronicle by the Native Felipe Guamán Poma de Ayala

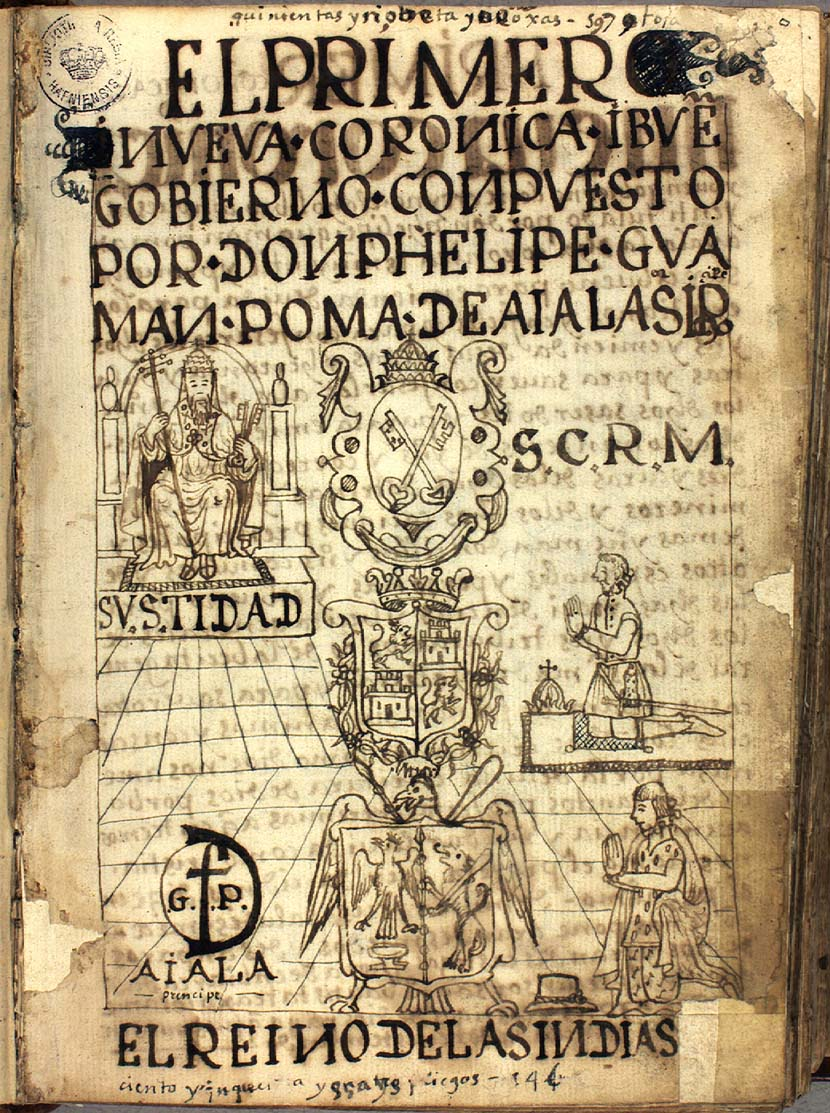
- Cover
- Author: Felipe Guamán Poma de Ayala
- Language: Spanish
- Genre: Chronicle of the Indies
- Published in: 1615
- Publication date: 1936
- Pages: 1,180

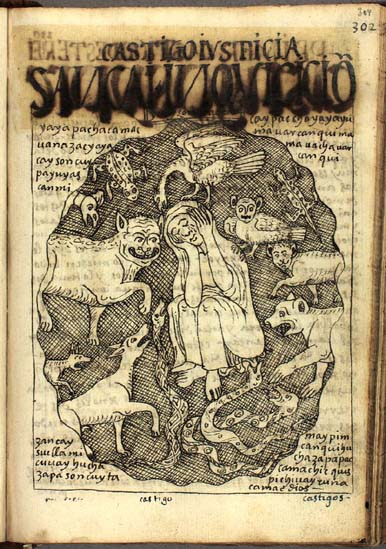
Sancayhuasi, jail of the Incas, an illustration from the book

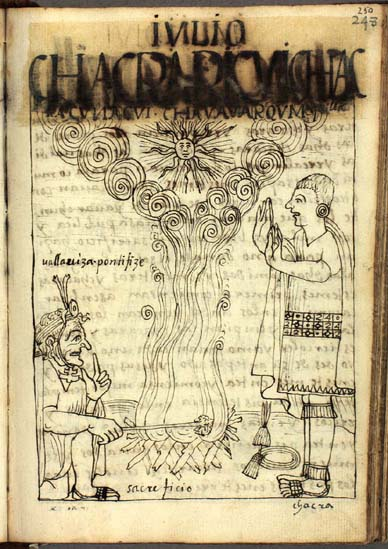
Chacra Ricuy

El primer nueva corónica y buen gobierno (English: The First New Chronicle and Good Government) is a Peruvian chronicle finished around 1615. Its author, the indigenous Peruvian Felipe Guamán Poma de Ayala, sent it as a handwritten manuscript to King Philip III of Spain, although it was never read by him. His purpose was to give a historical account of the Andes from the earliest human beings to the Incas and the Spanish conquest; it was also meant as a call of attention towards the deep problems caused by the Spanish government in the region.

The manuscript was never published and its location for the next several centuries was unknown. The scholar Richard Pietschmann rediscovered it at the Royal Danish Library in Copenhagen in 1908; Paul Rivet published a facsimile edition in Paris in 1936. Some researchers believe that the manuscript traveled from Spain to Denmark via the library of the Count-Duke of Olivares, in Spain, part of which was sold to Cornelius Pedersen Lerche, ambassador of Denmark in Spain. Nevertheless, this is only speculation.

== Content ==
The chronicle covers ancient Andean history, the rise of the Inca empire, the Spanish conquest in the 1530s, and early colonial society and government. Guamán Poma's discussion of Inca rule describes religion, social order, legislation, annual festivals and economic organization, as well as the functions of the different social groups. His narrative of Inca and pre-Inca times is often inaccurate according to modern understandings, but reflects how the Incas were remembered in the early colonial period, as well as Guamán Poma's distinctive ideas.

Approximately half the book is dedicated to a description and harsh critique of Spanish colonial rule; scholars consider this section of the book as a uniquely valuable and reliable historical source. The book contains a large number of detailed illustrations which are often reproduced in books and articles about pre-conquest and colonial Peru. Guamán Poma dedicated the book to King Philip III of Spain, in the hope of improving colonial rule, but there is no evidence that the king ever saw the book.

== Recognition ==
In 2007, UNESCO inscribed the manuscript in its Memory of the World International Register, which lists documentary heritage of global importance.

== Reprint ==
- Hackett Publishing, abridged edition, 2006, ISBN 0-87220-841-9

== Appropriations ==
Several pages of this manuscript were appropriated in the four large drawings on canvas with polychrome frames (¡Traga!, ¡Corre!, ¡Sopla!, ¡Muere!) made in 1992 by the painter Herman Braun-Vega for his Madrid retrospective on the occasion of the fifth centenary of the discovery of America by Christopher Columbus.

With the transfers of press clippings combined with drawings by Guamán Poma and engravings by Goya, Herman Braun-Vega highlights the suffering of civilians, eternal victims of wars. Braun-Vega again references Guamán Poma's drawings in his painting El poder se nutre de dogmas (Velázquez, Guaman Poma de Ayala, El Greco, Goya), this time to highlight the Church's role in the Spanish conquest through the evangelization of Peru's indigenous people.

== Bibliography ==
- Adorno, Rolena. Writing and Resistance in Colonial Peru, Texas University Press, 2000
