= Augusto Huaman Velasco =

Dr. Augusto Huaman Velasco
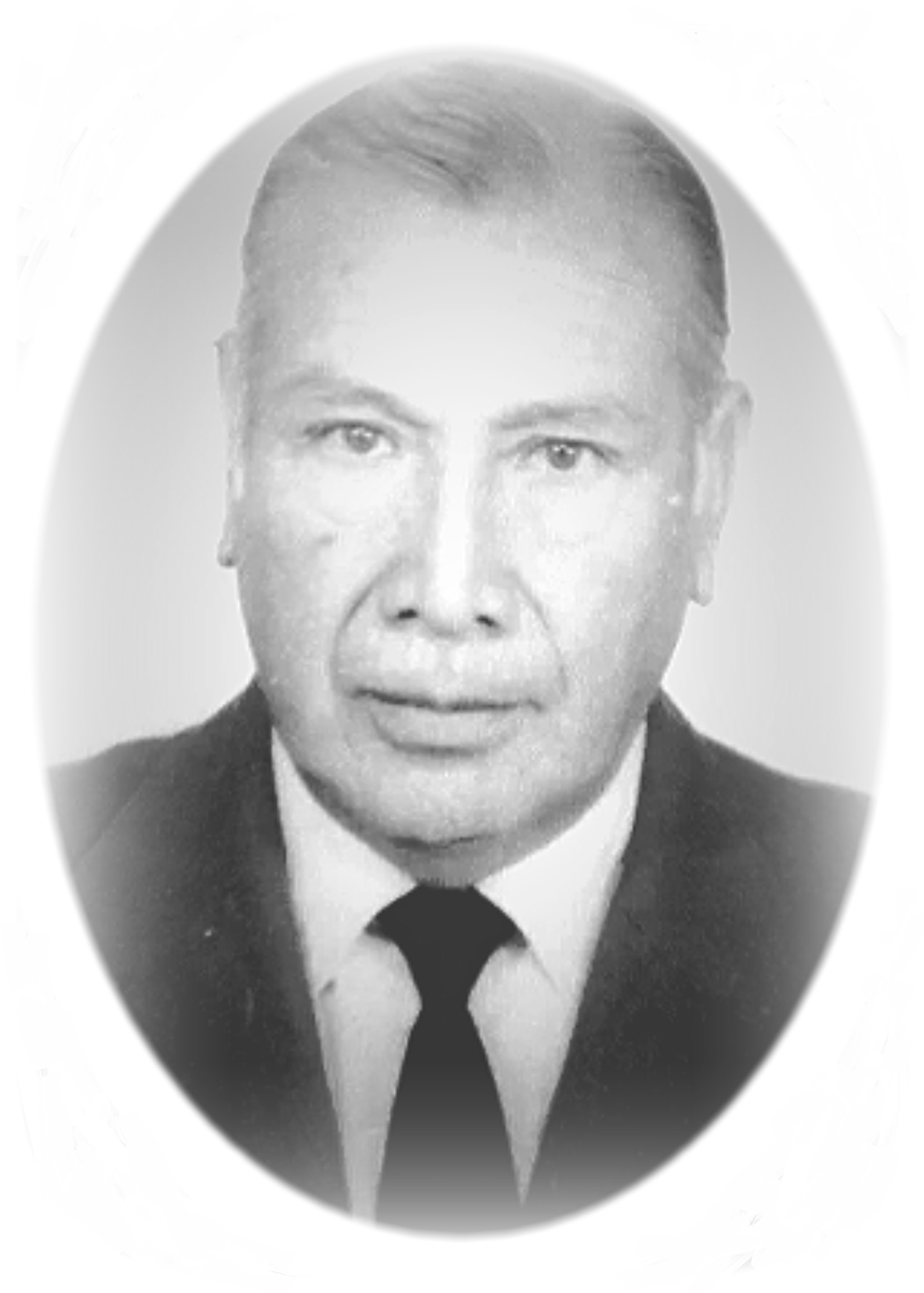

Personal details
- Born: September 1, 1924
- Died: July 20, 1998 (aged 73)
- Profession: Physician - Human Medicine

Augusto Huaman Velasco (September 1, 1924 in Lima, Peru – July 20, 1998) was a physician, philanthropist, humanitarian, statesman, lecturer and scientist.

== Early life ==
Huaman was the son of Gil Huaman who was known as a jurist, landowner and avid traveler. He studied at Nuestra Señora de Guadalupe High School in Lima. He graduated with honors from the Escuela San Fernando and medical school of the Universidad de San Marcos. He followed this with specialization studies in Spain and Germany. In 1942, he received a specialization in tropical diseases at Complutense University in Madrid.

== Career ==
At Complutense, Huaman met Gregorio Marañon. This meeting interested Huaman in mental illness. Huaman became involved in the recently created Institute of Medical Pathology and grew interested in tropical diseases. During the mid-1980s, Huaman earned a special denomination after an active cooperation at Universitäts Frauenklinik, Kiel, Germany, on pioneer work with laparoscopic appendectomy. Huaman devoted his life to research on health issues related to social and ethical issues in tropical environments, while he was most deeply concerned with the study of the development and proliferation of tropical diseases related to conditions of extreme poverty.

Huaman advised governments in health strategies to prevent epidemics in Europe and Latin America. From 1968 to 1975 he was involved in policy development and general strategy for social development programs. He was a key player in the creation of social programs for community health systems in Ecuador, Peru and Chile in the late 1960s. Huaman lectured in several Peruvian, Andean and European socialist universities, including Universidad Federico Villarreal, Universidad de Compostela, Universidad de San Marcos and Albert-Ludwigs-Universität Freiburg.
