= Inca Garcilaso de la Vega =

Writer, soldier, Spanish noble of Inca descent

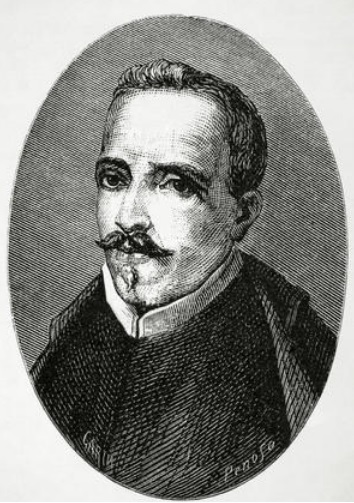
- Portrait of Garcilaso de la Vega, engraved by Carlos Penoso, 1879
- Born: 12 April 1539; Cusco, New Castile (current Peru)
- Died: 23 April 1616 (aged 77); Córdoba, Spain
- Occupations: Writer, historian
- Parent(s): Sebastián Garcilaso de la Vega (father); Isabel Chimpu Ocllo (mother)
- Writing career
- Language: Early Modern Spanish
- Genres: Chronicle; Autobiography
- Notable works: Comentarios Reales de los Incas La Florida del Inca The General History of Peru

Inca Garcilaso de la Vega (12 April 1539 – 23 April 1616), born Gómez Suárez de Figueroa and known as El Inca, was a chronicler and writer born in the Viceroyalty of Peru. Sailing to Spain at 21, he was educated informally there, where he lived and worked the rest of his life. The natural son of a Spanish conquistador and an Inca noblewoman born in the early years of the conquest, he is known primarily for his chronicles of Inca history, culture, and society. His work was widely read in Europe, influential and well received. It was the first literature by an author born in the Americas to enter the western canon.

After his father's death in 1559, Vega moved to Spain in 1561, seeking official acknowledgement as his father's son. His paternal uncle became a protector, and he lived in Spain for the rest of his life, where he wrote his histories of the Inca culture and Spanish conquest, as well as an account of De Soto's expedition in Florida.

== Early life ==
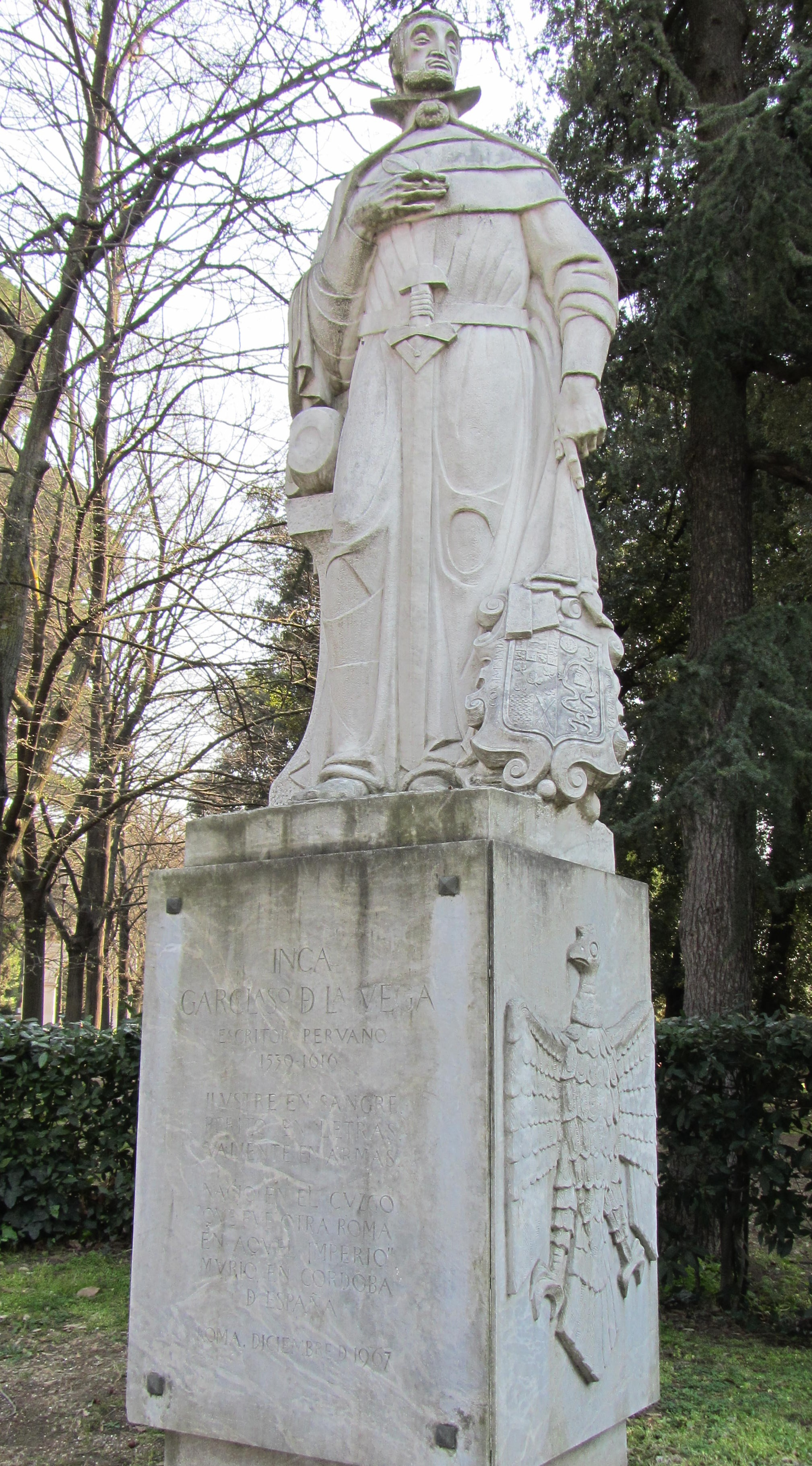
Statue of Garcilaso in Villa Borghese gardens, Rome

Gómez Suárez de Figueroa was born on April 12, 1539 in Cuzco, Peru, during the early years of the Spanish conquest. He was the natural son of the Spanish captain and conquistador Sebastián Garcilaso de la Vega y Vargas and the Inca ñusta (princess), Palla Chimpu Ocllo, the granddaughter of Huayna Capac who was baptized after the fall of Cuzco as Isabel Suárez Chimpu Ocllo. His mother was descended from Inca nobility, a daughter of Túpac Huallpa and a granddaughter of the powerful Inca Tupac Yupanqui. Because his parents were not married in the Catholic Church, he was considered illegitimate and the boy was given only his mother's surname. Under the Spanish system of caste that developed, he would have been classified as a mestizo (for his mixed parents).

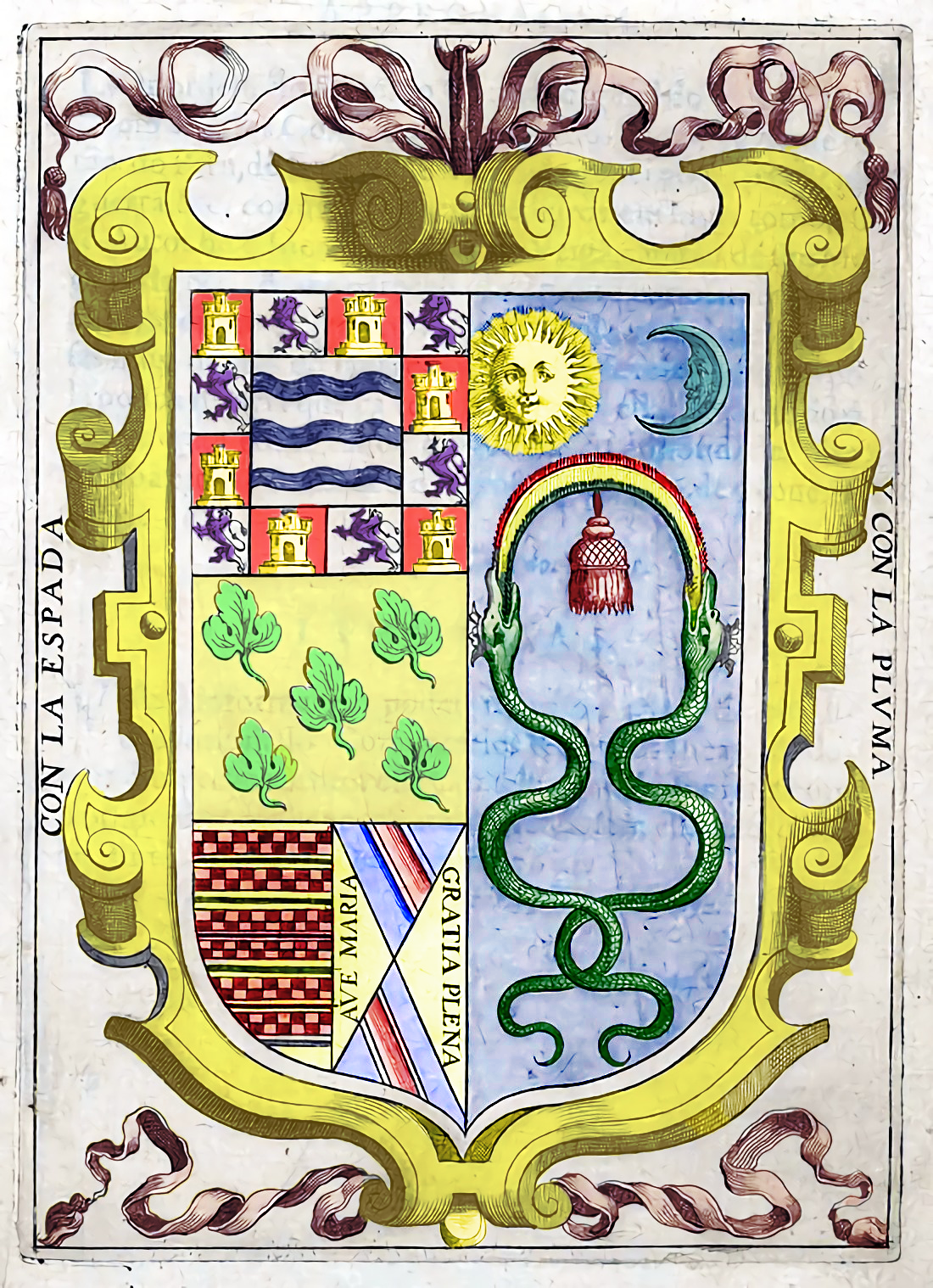
Coat of arms of Garcilaso illustrated in a 1609 document

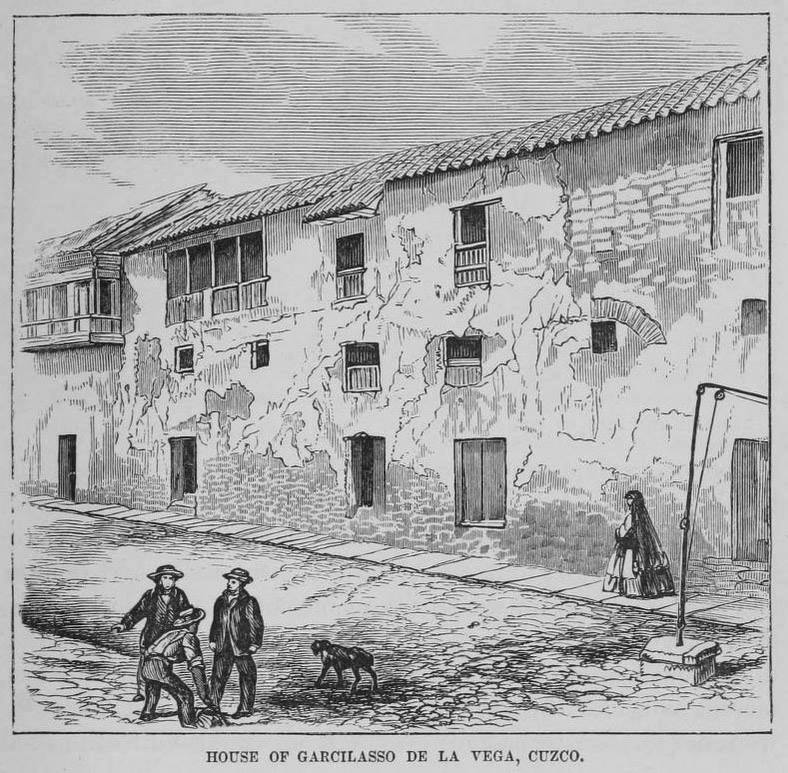
House of Garcilaso de la Vega in Cusco, Peru, in 1877

When Gómez was young, his father abandoned his mother and married a much younger Spanish noblewoman, doña Luisa Martel, who was only four years older than Gómez. As such, Gómez lived with his mother, her husband Juan de Pedroche, her Inca family and her two daughters, De la Vega's half-sisters Ana Ruíz, who went on to marry Martín de Bustinza, and Luisa de Herrera, who married Pedro Márquez de Galeoto (one of their children was Alonso Márquez de Figueroa). His first language was Quechua, but he also learned Spanish from early boyhood. He lived with his mother's family for the first ten years of his life before his father took the boy into his household and gave him an education. Garcilaso was taught by Juan de Cuéllar, a canon of the Cathedral of Cusco, who instructed boys his age, mostly mestizos or descendants of Inca rulers, including the sons of Francisco and Gonzalo Pizarro, in grammar and the sciences. Gómez also learned to interpret quipus and soon became skilled at reading them. At age fifteen, in 1554, when his father was appointed corregidor and justicia mayor of Cusco, Gómez served as his secretary, gaining firsthand contact with the conquistadors. He also recalled meeting his cousin, the Inca Sayri Túpac, son of Manco Inca with whom he shared a ritual drink of chicha from a silver qero. Garcilaso received an inheritance when his father died in 1559. The next year, at the age of 21, he left Peru for Spain.

== Travel to Spain ==
Suárez de Figueroa reached Spain in 1561 while there was still fighting in his native country under the conquest. He may have studied Latin in Seville under the tutelage of Pedro Sánchez de Herrera. The Spanish did not achieve their final victory until 1572. He traveled to Montilla, where he met his father's brother, Alonso de Vargas, who acted as the young man's protector and helped him make his way. The younger man soon traveled to Madrid to seek official acknowledgement as his father's son from the Crown, and he was allowed to take the name of Garcilaso de la Vega. Also referred to as "El Inca" or "Inca Garcilaso de la Vega", he received an informal education in Spain. Together with his uncle's support, gaining his father's name helped him integrate into Spanish society.

== Later life ==
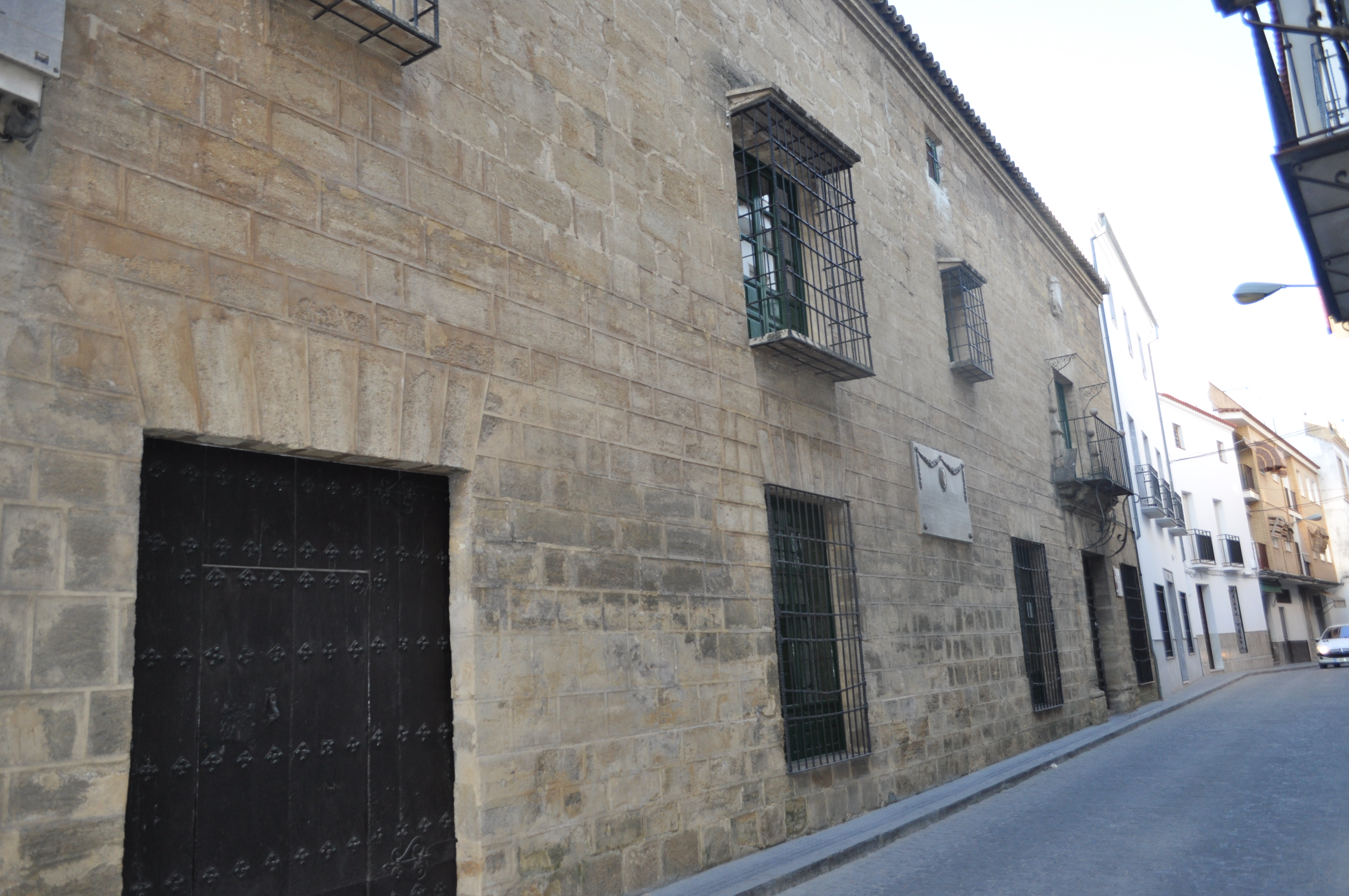
House of Garcilaso in Montilla, during his time in Spain

He remained in Spain and did not return to Peru. As warfare continued in the conquest, he was at political and even physical risk there because of his royal Inca lineage. It is recorded that he died in Córdoba on 23 April 1616, but it could have been up to two days earlier because of the inaccuracy of the existing documents.

== Personal life ==
He had at least two sons, born of relationships with different servants. One son was recorded as being born in 1570; he might have died at a very young age. With another servant, Garcilaso had a second son, Diego de Vargas, born in 1590, who helped his father copy the Royal Commentaries and survived him until at least 1651.

It is possible that his eldest son was the 'Admiral' Lope de Vega, who commanded a ship in the fleet of Álvaro de Mendaña, on his 1595 expedition to the Solomon Islands. Lope de Vega was lost at sea when his ship parted from Mendaña's fleet in a fog.

== Military service ==
De la Vega entered Spanish military service in 1570 and fought in the Alpujarras against the Moors after the Morisco Revolt. He received the rank of captain for his services to the Crown.

== Writings ==
He received a first-rate but informal European education in Spain after he moved there at age 21. His works are considered to have great literary value and are not simple historical chronicles. His maternal family were part of the ruling Inca and he portrays the Inca as benevolent rulers who governed a country where everybody was well-fed and happy before the Spanish came. Having learned first-hand about daily Inca life from his maternal relatives, he was able to convey that in his writings. He described the political system of tribute and labor enforced by the Incas from the subsidiary tribes in their empire.

Baptized and reared as Roman Catholic, he portrayed Incan religion and the expansion of its empire from a viewpoint influenced by his upbringing. He did not acknowledge or discuss the human sacrifices of the Inca. It is unknown whether that was an effort to portray his Inca ancestors in a more positive light to a Spanish audience or his ignorance of the practice having lived most of his life in Spain.

=== Historia de la Florida ===
De la Vega's first work was La Florida del Inca, an account of Hernando de Soto's expedition and journey in Florida. The work was published in Lisbon in 1605 and became popular. It describes the expedition according to its own records and information Garcilaso gathered during the years. He defended the legitimacy of imposing the Spanish sovereignty in conquered territories and submitting them to Catholic jurisdiction. At the same time, he expresses and defends the dignity, the courage, and the rationality of the Native Americans. It was translated and published in English in 1951.

Historians have identified problems with using La Florida as an historical account. Jerald T. Milanich and Charles M. Hudson warn against relying on Garcilaso, noting serious problems with the sequence of events and location of towns in his narrative. They say that "some historians regard Garcilaso's La Florida to be more a work of literature than a work of history." Lankford characterizes Garcilaso's La Florida as a collection of "legend narratives," derived from a much-retold oral tradition of the survivors of the expedition.

=== Comentarios Reales de los Incas ===
While in Spain, Garcilaso wrote his best-known work, Comentarios Reales de los Incas, published in Lisbon in 1609. It was based mostly on stories and oral histories told him by his Inca relatives when he was a child in Cusco, but also on the remnants of the history by Blas Valera which was mostly destroyed in the sacking of Cádiz in 1596. The Comentarios have two sections and volumes. The first was primarily about Inca life. The second, about the conquest of Peru, was published in 1617. It was first published in English in London in 1685, translated by Sir Paul Rycaut and titled The Royal Commentaries of Peru.

More than a century and a half after its initial publication, in the 1780s, as the uprising against colonial oppression led by Tupac Amaru II was gaining momentum, Charles III of Spain banned the Comentarios from being published in the Quechua language in Lima or distributed there on account of its "dangerous" content. The book was not reprinted in the Americas until 1918, but copies continued to circulate secretly. It was translated and printed in English in 1961 in the United States as The Incas, and in another edition in 1965 as Royal Commentaries of the Incas (see below).

Nineteenth-century Peruvian scholarship treated the Comentarios more skeptically. Rivero and Tschudi criticized the work in Antigüedades peruanas (1851) as both incomplete and failing the historiographic standards of their day.

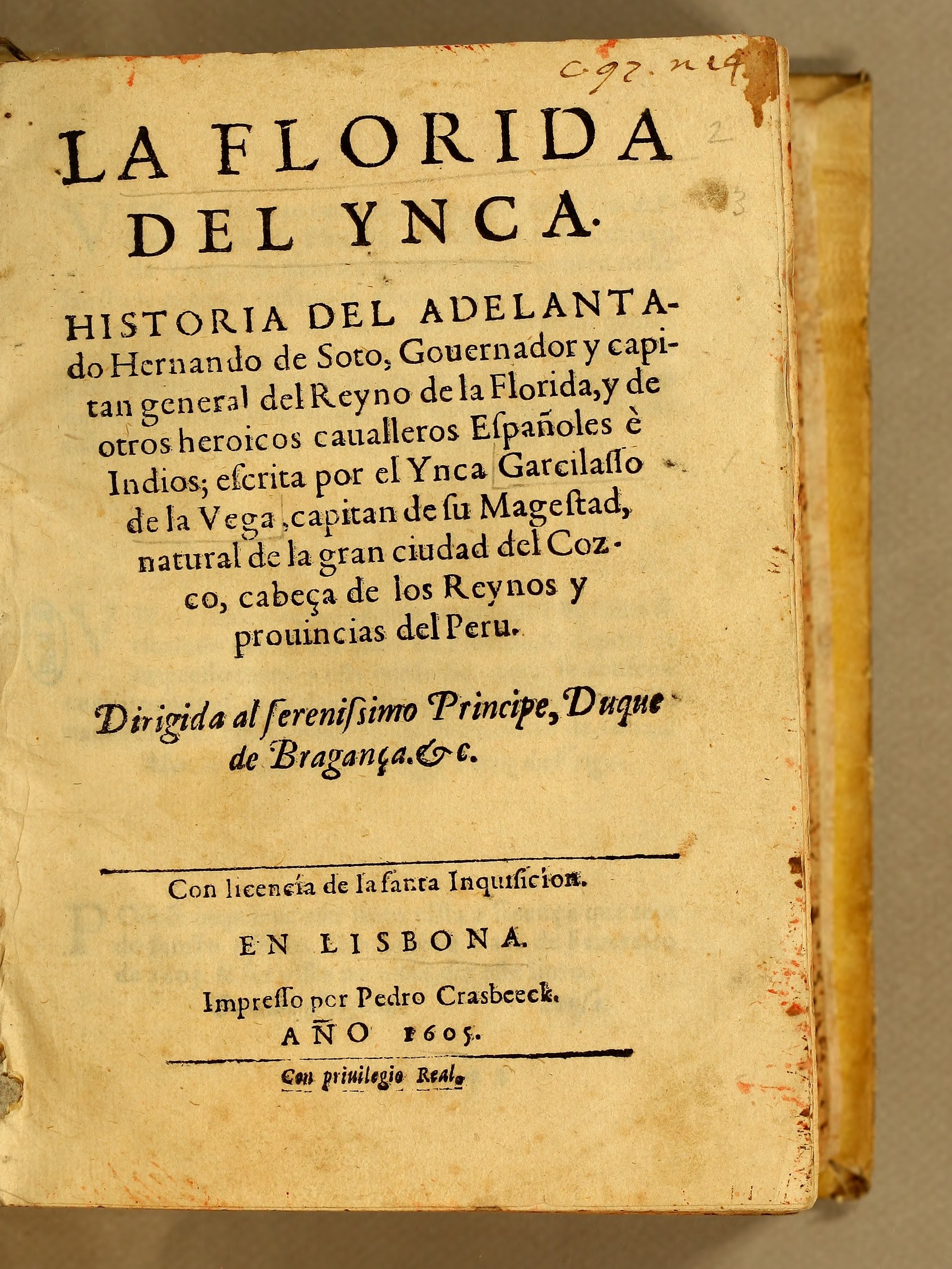
Title page of La Florida del Ynca (1605)

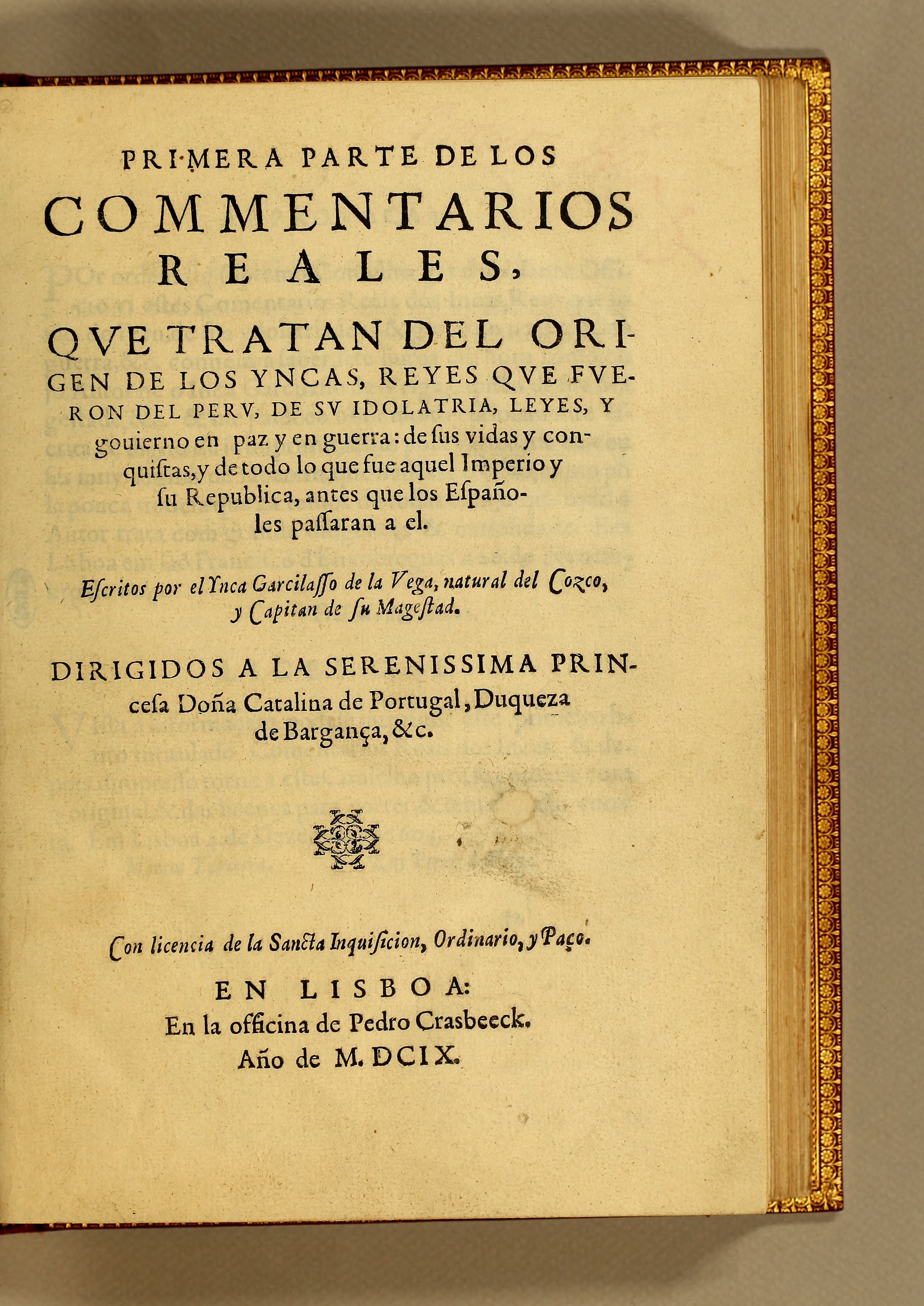
Title page of Comentarios Reales de los Incas (1609)

== Honors ==
- Cusco's main stadium, Estadio Garcilaso de la Vega, is named after him.
- The Regional Historical Museum of Cusco Casa del Inka Garcilaso de la Vega is also named after him and is located in his former house.
- In 1965, Inca Garcilaso de la Vega University, in Lima, Peru, was named in his honor.
- In Rome, Italy, near Villa Borghese, there is a statue dedicated to Inca Garcilaso de la Vega which was erected in 1967. A similar statue, dated 1973, stands in the Plaza República del Perú in Buenos Aires, Argentina.

== See also ==
- Fray Martín de Murúa
- Guaman Poma
- Blas Valera
- Diego Fernández
- Juan de Solórzano Pereira
