= Sebastián Garcilaso de la Vega y Vargas =

Spanish conquistador and colonial official

- Born: 1507; Badajoz, Crown of Castile
- Died: April 30, 1559; Cuzco, Viceroyalty of Peru
- Occupations: Conquistador, colonial official
- Known for: Spanish conquest of the Inca Empire; Pizarro–Almagro conflict Rebellion of Gonzalo Pizarro
- Spouse: Isabel Chimpu Ocllo (concubine)
- Children: Inca Garcilaso de la Vega
- Relatives: Garcilaso de la Vega (uncle)

Sebastián Garcilaso de la Vega y Vargas (1507 in Badajoz, Extremadura, Spain – 1559 in Cuzco, Viceroyalty of Peru) was a Spanish conquistador and colonial official. He fathered a son, the mestizo chronicler Garcilaso de la Vega, with the Inca princess Isabel Chimpu Occlo.

Garcilaso was the third son of Alonso de Hinestrosa de Vargas and Blanca de Sotomayor. He served with Pedro de Alvarado, and participated in the conquests of Hernán Cortés, first in Mexico and later in Guatemala. In 1534, he left for Peru. After arriving in Venezuela, he marched to Quito and later joined the army of Francisco Pizarro. After receiving orders to conquer the Cauca River valley, he abandoned the attempt to colonize the San Mateo Bay, returning to Lima with his eighty men to encounter Manco Inca Yupanqui.

He participated in the expedition to the Collao, along with Gonzalo Pizarro and Pedro de Oñate, defeating Tiso Yupanqui in the battle of Cochabamba.

Under the provision of the Royal Audiencia of Lima, he was honored as corregidor of Cuzco on November 17, 1554.
