= List of Guggenheim Fellowships awarded in 2018 =

←

List of Guggenheim Fellowships awarded in 2018: Guggenheim Fellowships have been awarded annually since 1925, by the John Simon Guggenheim Memorial Foundation to those "who have demonstrated exceptional capacity for productive scholarship or exceptional creative ability in the arts." The John Simon Guggenheim Memorial Foundation approved the awarding of 173 Guggenheim Fellowships, including two joint Fellowships, chosen from a group of almost 3,000 applicants in the Foundation’s ninety-fourth competition.

| Category | Field of Study | Fellow | Institutional association | Research topic | Ref |
|---|---|---|---|---|---|
| Creative Arts | Choreography | Nora Chipaumire | | Choreography | |
| Creative Arts | Choreography | John Heginbotham | Princeton University | Choreography | |
| Creative Arts | Choreography | Heather Kravas | | Choreography | |
| Creative Arts | Choreography | Aparna Ramaswamy | Ragamala Dance Company | Choreography | |
| Creative Arts | Choreography | Ranee Ramaswamy | Ragamala Dance Company | Choreography | |
| Creative Arts | Choreography | Jen Rosenblit | | Choreography | |
| Creative Arts | Choreography | Kota Yamazaki | | Choreography | |
| Creative Arts | Drama and Performance Art | Jorge Ignacio Cortiñas | Bard College | | |
| Creative Arts | Drama and Performance Art | Annie Dorsen | Bard College | | |
| Creative Arts | Drama and Performance Art | Robin Frohardt | University of North Carolina (fellow) | | |
| Creative Arts | Drama and Performance Art | Dohee Lee | | Local immigrant and refugee migration stories | |
| Creative Arts | Drama and Performance Art | David M. Levine | Harvard University | | |
| Creative Arts | Fiction | Rachel Cusk | | Writing | |
| Creative Arts | Fiction | Andrew Greer | Santa Maddalena Foundation | Writing | |
| Creative Arts | Fiction | Lauren Groff | Friends of Writers | Writing | |
| Creative Arts | Fiction | Jennifer Haigh | | Writing | |
| Creative Arts | Fiction | Min Jin Lee | | Writing | |
| Creative Arts | Fiction | China Miéville | | Writing | |
| Creative Arts | Fiction | Deb Olin Unferth | | Writing | |
| Creative Arts | Film - Video | Gina Petra Abatemarco | | | |
| Creative Arts | Film - Video | Peter Burr | | | |
| Creative Arts | Film - Video | William D. Caballero | | | |
| Creative Arts | Film - Video | Marsia Alexander-Clarke | | Video symphony inspired by Pablo Neruda's Veinte Poemas de Amor y una Cancion Desesperada | |
| Creative Arts | Film - Video | Alexandra Cuesta | | Documentary about life in the village of Susudel in southern Ecuador | |
| Creative Arts | Film - Video | Carol Dysinger | New York University Tisch School of the Arts | Live documentary installation | |
| Creative Arts | Film - Video | Eliza Hittman | Pratt Institute | | |
| Creative Arts | Film - Video | Shevaun Mizrahi | Massachusetts College of Art and Design | | |
| Creative Arts | Film - Video | Nicolás Pereda | Mason Gross School of the Arts | | |
| Creative Arts | Film - Video | Lee Anne Schmitt | California Institute of the Arts | | |
| Creative Arts | Film - Video | Parvez Sharma | | | |
| Creative Arts | Film - Video | Nandini Sikand | Lafayette College | Documentary about women and mass incarceration in Pennsylvania | |
| Creative Arts | Film - Video | Brett Story | Ryerson University | The Hottest August | |
| Creative Arts | Fine Arts | Dennis Adams | Cooper Union | | |
| Creative Arts | Fine Arts | Mequitta Ahuja | | Self-portraiture | |
| Creative Arts | Fine Arts | Dave Hullfish Bailey | | Sculpture | |
| Creative Arts | Fine Arts | Janet Biggs | | Lengths of human movement and ambition; filming in the Horn of Africa and at the Mars Desert Research Station | |
| Creative Arts | Fine Arts | Phillip Chen | Drake University | "Printmaking’s ability to proliferate critical pronouncements on behalf of social justice" | |
| Creative Arts | Fine Arts | Julia Christensen | Oberlin College | Impact of technological "upgrade culture" on institutions, archives, and scientific research | |
| Creative Arts | Fine Arts | Esperanza Cortés | | | |
| Creative Arts | Fine Arts | Craig Drennen | Georgia State University | Painting | |
| Creative Arts | Fine Arts | Amy Feldman | | Painting, drawing, ceramics | |
| Creative Arts | Fine Arts | Richard Fleischner | | | |
| Creative Arts | Fine Arts | Kate Gilmore | State University of New York | Series of exhibitions and live performances addressing "our current state, how we choose to participate in it, and how we as a community can demand it change" | |
| Creative Arts | Fine Arts | Todd Gray | | Colonized people and places in Africa | |
| Creative Arts | Fine Arts | Hiroyuki Hamada | | Sculpture | |
| Creative Arts | Fine Arts | Dave Hardy | | | |
| Creative Arts | Fine Arts | Stephen Hayes | | Work on his In the Hour Before painting series, which reimagines settings of tragedies | |
| Creative Arts | Fine Arts | Lies Kraal | | Painting | |
| Creative Arts | Fine Arts | Elizabeth LaPensée | State University of New York at Purchase | Merging virtual reality and 360 film to express Indigenous scientific teachings | |
| Creative Arts | Fine Arts | Chris Larson | University of Minnesota | Art inspired by how workspaces impact the way people understand social class and identity | |
| Creative Arts | Fine Arts | Robert L. Lobe | | Sculpture | |
| Creative Arts | Fine Arts | Nicole Miller | University of California, San Diego | | |
| Creative Arts | Fine Arts | Amy Pleasant | | Painting | |
| Creative Arts | Fine Arts | Annabeth Rosen | University of California, Davis | Sculpture | |
| Creative Arts | Fine Arts | Margo Sawyer | University of Texas at Austin | Designs of spaces transcendent, such as "public places that foster contemplation" | |
| Creative Arts | Fine Arts | David Schutter | University of Chicago | Project using Thomas Eakins' archives | |
| Creative Arts | Fine Arts | Charles Yuen | | Painting | |
| Creative Arts | Music Composition | Eugene Birman | Hong Kong Baptist University | Commission for a leading British vocal ensemble on the topic of fake news and Russian foreign policy | |
| Creative Arts | Music Composition | Du Yun | Peabody Institute | Composition | |
| Creative Arts | Music Composition | Michael Harrison | | New work for Alarm Will Sound | |
| Creative Arts | Music Composition | Edward Jacobs | East Carolina University | Work on composition commissions | |
| Creative Arts | Music Composition | Tonia Ko | | Work on an opera with five soloists (Mapmakers) and a bubble wrap concerto with a chamber orchestra | |
| Creative Arts | Music Composition | Eric Lyon | Virginia Tech | Spatial audio research and composition | |
| Creative Arts | Music Composition | Farangis Nurulla-Khoja | | "Sounds unheard and forms unseen" | |
| Creative Arts | Music Composition | Yoshiaki Onishi | Ensemble Exophonie Tokyo | Composition | |
| Creative Arts | Music Composition | Mika Pelo | University of California, Davis | Writing an opera | |
| Creative Arts | Music Composition | Felipe Salles | | Composition | |
| Creative Arts | Music Composition | Carl Schimmel | Illinois State University | Exploration of methods of expressing narrative in musical form | |
| Creative Arts | Music Composition | Anna Webber | | Composition | |
| Creative Arts | Photography | Tsar Fedorsky | Taft School | | |
| Creative Arts | Photography | Lukas Felzmann | Stanford University | Creation of a new photographic archive of California | |
| Creative Arts | Photography | Anthony Hernandez | | Abstract and minimal landscape photographs | |
| Creative Arts | Photography | David Maisel | | Dugway Proving Ground | |
| Creative Arts | Photography | Pradip Malde | University of the South | Female genital mutilation through the lens of loss and sacrifice | |
| Creative Arts | Photography | Rania Matar | Massachusetts College of Art and Design | Transitional period of leaving home for the first time | |
| Creative Arts | Photography | Nicholas Muellner | Ithaca College | | |
| Creative Arts | Photography | Kristine Potter | | Bodies of water with violent or ominous names | |
| Creative Arts | Photography | Meghann Riepenhoff | | | |
| Creative Arts | Photography | Nadia Sablin | State University of New York at New Paltz | Passage of seasons in Alekhovshchina, Russia | |
| Creative Arts | Photography | Hank Willis Thomas | | | |
| Creative Arts | Photography | Ian van Coller | Montana State University | Evolution of polar ice | |
| Creative Arts | Poetry | Reginald Dwayne Betts | Yale University (PhD candidate) | Writing | |
| Creative Arts | Poetry | Amy Gerstler | University of California, Irvine | Writing | |
| Creative Arts | Poetry | Tyehimba Jess | College of Staten Island | Writing | |
| Creative Arts | Poetry | Ilya Kaminsky | San Diego State University | Writing | |
| Creative Arts | Poetry | Joan Naviyuk Kane | | Writing | |
| Creative Arts | Poetry | Dunya Mikhail | Oakland University | Writing | |
| Creative Arts | Poetry | Srikanth Reddy | University of Chicago | Writing | |
| Creative Arts | Poetry | Anya Krugovoy | Mercer University | Writing | |
| Creative Arts | Poetry | Monica Youn | Princeton University | Writing | |
| Humanities | African Studies | Nancy Rose Hunt | University of Florida | "Ideation as History" | |
| Humanities | Architecture, Planning and Design | Edward Dimendberg | University of California, Irvine | Architecture and urbanism | |
| Humanities | Architecture, Planning and Design | Charlie Hailey | University of Florida | How climate, building, and community overlap in meaningful ways and how architecture and the humanities intertwine | |
| Humanities | Classics | Alain Bresson | University of Chicago | Specific form taken by money in the ancient Greek world, with a central focus on the question on why the Greeks "invented" coinage | |
| Humanities | Classics | Brooke Holmes | Princeton University | Greco-Roman roots of Western ideas about the physical body, the natural world, matter and the non-human | |
| Humanities | Dance Studies | Mark Franko | Temple University | French dance and politics in the first half of the 20th century | |
| Humanities | East Asian Studies | Martin Kern | Princeton University | Textual culture of Chinese antiquity during the first millennium BCE | |
| Humanities | East Asian Studies | Wai-yee Li | Harvard University | Intersections of material culture, aesthetics, literature, and intellectual history in late imperial China | |
| Humanities | East Asian Studies | Nicolas Tackett | University of California, Berkeley | Rise of merit over ancestry as a primary marker of status in China during the 10th and 11th centuries | |
| Humanities | English Literature | Devoney Looser | Arizona State University | Jane and Anna Maria Porter | |
| Humanities | European and Latin American Literature | Eleanor Kaufman | University of California, Los Angeles | Structure: A Counterhistory of Twentieth-Century French Philosophy | |
| Humanities | European and Latin American History | Rita Chin | University of Michigan | Invisible Labor: A History of Female Migrant Domestics in Postcolonial Europe | |
| Humanities | European and Latin American History | Ada Ferrer | New York University | Popular history of Cuba | |
| Humanities | European and Latin American History | Paul Friedland | Cornell University | A World Without Race: The Dream of a Universal Republic in the Revolutionary French Caribbean | |
| Humanities | European and Latin American History | Joel F. Harrington | Vanderbilt University | Hans Staden | |
| Humanities | European and Latin American History | Thomas Miller Klubock | University of Virginia | History of water and water wars in modern South America | |
| Humanities | European and Latin American History | Edward Wright-Rios | Vanderbilt University | Pilgrimage in modern Mexico | |
| Humanities | Film, Video and Radio Studies | Alison Griffiths | Baruch College | Expedition film, a genre during the interwar period, and intellectual roots in earlier moments and practices of travel | |
| Humanities | Fine Arts Research | C. Jean Campbell | Emory University | Imitative practice and pictorial invention in the art of Pisanello | |
| Humanities | Fine Arts Research | Branden W. Joseph | Columbia University | Works by Kathy Acker, Jack Smith, Lee Lozano, and Carolee Schneemann | |
| Humanities | General Nonfiction | Nicholson Baker | | Government secrets and the Freedom of Information Act | |
| Humanities | General Nonfiction | Teju Cole | | | |
| Humanities | General Nonfiction | Robert Finch | | | |
| Humanities | General Nonfiction | Roxane Gay | Purdue University | Collection of essays exploring television and American culture | |
| Humanities | General Nonfiction | Jane Kamensky | Harvard University | History of the sexual revolution as revealed by the biography of feminist sex radical Candida Royalle | |
| Humanities | General Nonfiction | John Jeremiah Sullivan | The Paris Review | | |
| Humanities | General Nonfiction | Lily Tuck | | | |
| Humanities | History of Science, Technology and Economics | Joyce Chaplin | Harvard University | Climate change in colonial Africa | |
| Humanities | History of Science, Technology and Economics | Erik M. Conway | California Institute of Technology | | |
| Humanities | History of Science, Technology and Economics | Robert G. Morrison | Bowdoin College | Jewish scholarly intermediaries between the Ottoman Empire and Renaissance Italy | |
| Humanities | History of Science, Technology and Economics | Thomas S. Mullaney | Stanford University | Global history of non-Latin typography and type design in the modern era | |
| Humanities | History of Science, Technology and Economics | Naomi Oreskes | Harvard University | | |
| Humanities | History of Science, Technology and Economics | Ekaterina Pravilova | Princeton University | History of the Russian ruble (1768-1917) | |
| Humanities | Intellectual and Cultural History | Irena Grudzińska-Gross | Polish Academy of Sciences | | |
| Humanities | Intellectual and Cultural History | Saidiya Hartman | Columbia University | Social upheaval and radical transformation of everyday life in the emergent Black ghetto in the early 20th century | |
| Humanities | Intellectual and Cultural History | Scott Johnson | University of Oklahoma | Cultural biography of Syriac | |
| Humanities | Intellectual and Cultural History | Marci Shore | Yale University | Phenomenological Encounters: Scenes from Central Europe | |
| Humanities | Intellectual and Cultural History | Stefania Tutino | University of California, Los Angeles | 17th-century forgery case that provoked a 20-year-long debate in the Roman Curia over the authenticity of the documents on which the forgery was based | |
| Humanities | Linguistics | Lenore A. Grenoble | University of Chicago | Relationship between language and well-being among Arctic Indigenous peoples in the face of rapidly changing social and environmental conditions, including urbanization and climate changes | |
| Humanities | Linguistics | Charles Yang | University of Pennsylvania | How children learn to count and how they develop the conceptual understanding of numbers | |
| Humanities | Literary Criticism | Anna Brickhouse | University of Virginia | Earthquake Aesthetics: Catastrophe and the Forms of Critique | |
| Humanities | Literary Criticism | Theo Davis | Northeastern University | New theory of ornamentation that emphasizes attention and accompaniment rather than materiality | |
| Humanities | Literary Criticism | Martin Hägglund | Yale University | New vision of leading a secular life, both individually and collectively | |
| Humanities | Literary Criticism | Shari Huhndorf | University of California, Berkeley | Indigeneity and the Politics of Space: Gender, Geography, Culture | |
| Humanities | Medieval and Renaissance Literature | Stratis Papaioannou | Brown University | Narrative history of Byzantine literature | |
| Humanities | Medieval and Renaissance Literature | Michelle R. Warren | Dartmouth College | Production and reception of a single medieval manuscript across 800 years | |
| Humanities | Music Research | David Yearsley | Cornell University | Humorous side of Johann Sebastian Bach | |
| Humanities | Philosophy | Sally Haslanger | Massachusetts Institute of Technology | Social practices and social structure with an emphasis on the materiality of social practices and the role of ideology | |
| Humanities | Philosophy | John Heil | Washington University in St. Louis | Relation between the world as it appears to us and the world as it is revealed by fundamental physics | |
| Humanities | Religion | Bart D. Ehrman | University of North Carolina-Chapel Hill | How early Christian conceptions of the afterlife were formed by and also shaped their respective contexts | |
| Humanities | Religion | Nile Green | University of California, Los Angeles | What global Islam is and where it came from | |
| Humanities | Religion | Jeremy Schipper | Temple University | Biblical interpretation in the defense and prosecution of Denmark Vesey | |
| Humanities | South Asian Studies | Christian Lee Novetzke | Jackson School of International Studies | Work on two books projects: the first looks at the role of devotionalism in the creation of political ethics in Maharashtra over the last 700 years; the second explores yoga as a political idea in India and globally | |
| Humanities | South Asian Studies | Archana Venkatesan | University of California, Davis | Festival of Recitation at Visnu temples in Tamil Nadu | |
| Humanities | Translation | Esther Allen | Baruch College | Completion of translations of Antonio Di Benedetto's El silenciero (1964) and Las suicidas (1968) | |
| Humanities | United States History | Kathleen DuVal | University of North Carolina, Chapel Hill | American Indian dominance in the centuries before 1850 | |
| Humanities | United States History | Aaron Spencer Fogleman | Northern Illinois University | Monograph: Immigrant Voices: European and African Stories of Freedom, Unfreedom, and Identity through Four Centuries of Transatlantic Migrations to the Americas | |
| Humanities | United States History | Martha Hodes | New York University | Semi-autobiography recounting a 1970 airplane hijacking in Jordan | |
| Natural Sciences | Applied Mathematics | Edriss S. Titi | Texas A&M University | Advancement of the mathematical study and justification of the atmospheric dynamics climate models with moisture, and to investigate and develop downscaling algorithms for data assimilation of weather and climate predictions | |
| Natural Sciences | Astronomy and Astrophysics | Shri Kulkarni | California Institute of Technology | Exotic cosmological explosions | |
| Natural Sciences | Chemistry | William Dichtel | Northwestern University | Very early-stage effort to understand and react to form materials with designed, uniform structures and tiny voids | |
| Natural Sciences | Chemistry | Christy L. Haynes | University of Minnesota | Adaption of analytical methods to characterize novel, technologically relevant nanomaterials in an environmental matrix | |
| Natural Sciences | Computer Science | Ariel D. Procaccia | Carnegie Mellon University | Mechanisms that would enable voters to participate in the process of allocating a city's budget | |
| Natural Sciences | Earth Science | Alexey Fedorov | Yale University | Global ocean circulation in warm climates | |
| Natural Sciences | Engineering | Arup K. Chakraborty | Massachusetts Institute of Technology | Induction of broadly neutralizing antibodies against highly mutable pathogens | |
| Natural Sciences | Mathematics | Moon Duchin | Tufts University | Geometric group theory and gerrymandering | |
| Natural Sciences | Medicine and Health | Charles L. Bosk | University of Pennsylvania | Tension between professional and managerial definitions of "error" and why improvements in patient safety and quality of care have been elusive | |
| Natural Sciences | Medicine and Health | Carl Elliott | University of Minnesota | Human subjects research scandals exposed by whistleblowers in four different countries | |
| Natural Sciences | Molecular and Cellular Biology | Antonis Rokas | Vanderbilt University | How the study of fungi can expand common views in evolutionary biology | |
| Natural Sciences | Neuroscience | Aniruddh D. Patel | Tufts University | Evolutionary music cognition | |
| Natural Sciences | Organismic Biology & Ecology | Robert B. Jackson | Stanford University | Soil fertility and water supply in plants | |
| Natural Sciences | Organismic Biology & Ecology | Anne D. Yoder | Duke University | Family tree of mouse lemurs | |
| Natural Sciences | Physics | Lisa Randall | Harvard University | | |
| Natural Sciences | Physics | Michael T. Woodside | University of Alberta | How evolution shapes the folding of individual proteins by reconstructing ancient versions of modern-day proteins to discover how the folding process has changed | |
| Social Sciences | Anthropology and Cultural Studies | Sienna R. Craig | Dartmouth College | Literary ethnography and short stories that discuss immigration between Nepal and New York | |
| Social Sciences | Anthropology and Cultural Studies | Stefan Helmreich | Massachusetts Institute of Technology | Ethnographic account of how scientists measure, model, and monitor ocean waves in an era of climate change | |
| Social Sciences | Anthropology and Cultural Studies | Sabine Hyland | University of St Andrews | Hidden Texts of the Andes | |
| Social Sciences | Constitutional Studies | Carol Anderson | Emory University | | |
| Social Sciences | Geography and Environmental Studies | Jesse Ribot | University of Illinois, Urbana-Champaign | Book about his field research in the Sahel region and multiple comparative studies on human rights, representation, rural food security and theoretical work on climate-related vulnerability | |
| Social Sciences | Law | Jessica Silbey | Northeastern University | Intellectual property debates in law and culture as a bellwether of changing social justice needs in the 21st century | |
| Social Sciences | Sociology | Christopher A. Bail | Duke University | Social media "echo chamber" | |
| Social Sciences | Sociology | Robert J. Sampson | Harvard University | Transition to adulthood under conditions of mass incarcteration | |
| Social Sciences | Political Science | Peter A. Hall | Harvard University | Relationship between changes in the political economy and changes in electoral policies | |
| Social Sciences | Political Science | Vivien A. Schmidt | Boston University | Rhetoric of discontent through a transatlantic investigation of the populist revolt against globalization and Europeanization | |
| Social Sciences | Psychology | Fei Xu | University of California, Berkeley | Cognitive and language development in children, particularly the "rational constructionism" approach | |

== See also ==
- Guggenheim Fellowship
- List of Guggenheim Fellowships awarded in 2017
- List of Guggenheim Fellowships awarded in 2019
