= List of Guggenheim Fellowships awarded in 2017 =

List of Guggenheim Fellowships awarded in 2017: Guggenheim Fellowships have been awarded annually since 1925, by the John Simon Guggenheim Memorial Foundation to those "who have demonstrated exceptional capacity for productive scholarship or exceptional creative ability in the arts."

| Category | Field of Study | Fellow | Ref |
|---|---|---|---|
| Creative Arts | Biography | Holly Brubach | |
| Creative Arts | Choreography | Keely Garfield | |
| Creative Arts | Choreography | Keith Hennessy | |
| Creative Arts | Choreography | Yvonne Meier | |
| Creative Arts | Choreography | Will Rawls | |
| Creative Arts | Choreography | Melinda Ring | |
| Creative Arts | Choreography | Pramila Vasudevan | |
| Creative Arts | Drama and Performance Art | Carson Kreitzer | |
| Creative Arts | Drama and Performance Art | Aaron Landsman | |
| Creative Arts | Drama and Performance Art | Rogelio Martínez | |
| Creative Arts | Drama and Performance Art | Carmelita Tropicana | |
| Creative Arts | Drama and Performance Art | Marianne Weems | |
| Creative Arts | Fiction | Brian Evenson | |
| Creative Arts | Fiction | Michelle Huneven | |
| Creative Arts | Fiction | Samantha Hunt | |
| Creative Arts | Fiction | Phil Klay | |
| Creative Arts | Fiction | Fiona Maazel | |
| Creative Arts | Fiction | Alexander Maksik | |
| Creative Arts | Fiction | Viet Thanh Nguyen | |
| Creative Arts | Fiction | Ron Rash | |
| Creative Arts | Fiction | Marisa Silver | |
| Creative Arts | Film-Video | Signe Baumane | |
| Creative Arts | Film-Video | Zackary Canepari | |
| Creative Arts | Film-Video | Laura Ann Harrison | |
| Creative Arts | Film-Video | Kirsten Johnson | |
| Creative Arts | Film-Video | Mike Kuchar | |
| Creative Arts | Film-Video | Jen Liu | |
| Creative Arts | Film-Video | Cynthia Madansky | |
| Creative Arts | Film-Video | Antonio Méndez Esparza | |
| Creative Arts | Film-Video | Rodrigo Reyes | |
| Creative Arts | Film-Video | A. V. Rockwell | |
| Creative Arts | Film-Video | J.P. Sniadecki | |
| Creative Arts | Film-Video | Steven Subotnick | |
| Creative Arts | Film-Video | Billy Woodberry | |
| Creative Arts | Fine Arts | Derek Boshier | |
| Creative Arts | Fine Arts | Kathe Burkhart | |
| Creative Arts | Fine Arts | Cassils | |
| Creative Arts | Fine Arts | Mahwish Chishty | |
| Creative Arts | Fine Arts | Joseph DeLappe | |
| Creative Arts | Fine Arts | Lesley Dill | |
| Creative Arts | Fine Arts | Harry Dodge | |
| Creative Arts | Fine Arts | Eugenio Espinoza | |
| Creative Arts | Fine Arts | Elana Herzog | |
| Creative Arts | Fine Arts | Nicholas A. Hill | |
| Creative Arts | Fine Arts | Byron Kim | |
| Creative Arts | Fine Arts | Jennie Jieun Lee | |
| Creative Arts | Fine Arts | John W. Love Jr. | |
| Creative Arts | Fine Arts | James Luna | |
| Creative Arts | Fine Arts | Shari Mendelson | |
| Creative Arts | Fine Arts | Sandeep Mukherjee | |
| Creative Arts | Fine Arts | Paul O'Keeffe | |
| Creative Arts | Fine Arts | Jefferson Pinder | |
| Creative Arts | Fine Arts | Hunter Reynolds | |
| Creative Arts | Fine Arts | Kay Rosen | |
| Creative Arts | Fine Arts | Paul Rucker | |
| Creative Arts | Fine Arts | Zina Saro-Wiwa | |
| Creative Arts | Fine Arts | Jeanne Silverthorne | |
| Creative Arts | Fine Arts | Roy Thurston | |
| Creative Arts | Fine Arts | Leslie Wayne | |
| Creative Arts | General Nonfiction | Kevin Baker | |
| Creative Arts | General Nonfiction | Emily Rapp Black | |
| Creative Arts | General Nonfiction | Susan Faludi | |
| Creative Arts | General Nonfiction | Masha Gessen | |
| Creative Arts | General Nonfiction | David Mikics | |
| Creative Arts | General Nonfiction | Ander Monson | |
| Creative Arts | General Nonfiction | Benjamin Moser | |
| Creative Arts | General Nonfiction | Cynthia Saltzman | |
| Creative Arts | Music Composition | John Aylward | |
| Creative Arts | Music Composition | Oscar Bettison | |
| Creative Arts | Music Composition | Dániel Péter Biró | |
| Creative Arts | Music Composition | Mahir Cetiz | |
| Creative Arts | Music Composition | Cindy Cox | |
| Creative Arts | Music Composition | Ashley Fure | |
| Creative Arts | Music Composition | Annie Gosfield | |
| Creative Arts | Music Composition | Alec Hall | |
| Creative Arts | Music Composition | Shelley Hirsch | |
| Creative Arts | Music Composition | Joel Hoffman | |
| Creative Arts | Music Composition | Christopher Stark | |
| Creative Arts | Music Composition | Hans Thomalla | |
| Creative Arts | Music Composition | Jeff "Tain" Watts | |
| Creative Arts | Photography | Marina Berio | |
| Creative Arts | Photography | Mary F. Calvert | |
| Creative Arts | Photography | Daniel W. Coburn | |
| Creative Arts | Photography | Ken Gonzales-Day | |
| Creative Arts | Photography | Thilde Jensen | |
| Creative Arts | Photography | Leigh Ledare | |
| Creative Arts | Photography | Michael Lundgren | |
| Creative Arts | Photography | Amanda Means | |
| Creative Arts | Photography | Shaun O'Boyle | |
| Creative Arts | Photography | Maggie Steber | |
| Creative Arts | Photography | Zoe Strauss | |
| Creative Arts | Photography | Brad Temkin | |
| Creative Arts | Poetry | Michelle Boisseau | |
| Creative Arts | Poetry | Victoria Chang | |
| Creative Arts | Poetry | Jennifer Grotz | |
| Creative Arts | Poetry | Matthea Harvey | |
| Creative Arts | Poetry | Ishion Hutchinson | |
| Creative Arts | Poetry | Davis McCombs | |
| Creative Arts | Poetry | Gregory Pardlo | |
| Creative Arts | Poetry | Claudia Rankine | |
| Creative Arts | Poetry | Patrick Rosal | |
| Creative Arts | Poetry | Michael Waters | |
| Creative Arts | Poetry | Afaa M. Weaver | |
| Humanities | American Literature | Samuel Otter | |
| Humanities | Classics | Thomas K. Hubbard | |
| Humanities | Classics | Adriaan Lanni | |
| Humanities | Dance Studies | Brian Seibert | |
| Humanities | English Literature | Adela Pinch | |
| Humanities | English Literature | Mark Schoenfield | |
| Humanities | European and Latin American History | Michael David-Fox | |
| Humanities | European and Latin American History | Jochen Hellbeck | |
| Humanities | European and Latin American History | Stefan-Ludwig Hoffmann | |
| Humanities | European and Latin American History | Timothy D. Snyder | |
| Humanities | European and Latin American History | Suzanne Stewart-Steinberg | |
| Humanities | Fine Arts Research | Adam Herring | |
| Humanities | Fine Arts Research | Bissera V. Pentcheva | |
| Humanities | History of Science, Technology and Economics | Robert Aronowitz | |
| Humanities | History of Science, Technology and Economics | Susan D. Jones | |
| Humanities | Intellectual and Cultural History | Julia A. Clancy-Smith | |
| Humanities | Intellectual and Cultural History | Margaret Cohen | |
| Humanities | Intellectual and Cultural History | Sharon Marcus | |
| Humanities | Intellectual and Cultural History | Cheryl Misak | |
| Humanities | Linguistics | Bryan Gick | |
| Humanities | Literary Criticism | Peter J. Kalliney | |
| Humanities | Literary Criticism | Martin Puchner | |
| Humanities | Medieval and Renaissance Literature | Rita Copeland | |
| Humanities | Medieval and Renaissance Literature | Paolo Squatriti | |
| Humanities | Music Research | Jesse Rodin | |
| Humanities | Philosophy | Margaret Morrison | |
| Humanities | Philosophy | Michael Strevens | |
| Humanities | Religion | Mark E. Chancey | |
| Humanities | Religion | Jonathan H. Ebel | |
| Humanities | Religion | Michael D. McNally | |
| Humanities | South Asian Studies | John E. Cort | |
| Humanities | Theatre Arts | Stacy Wolf | |
| Humanities | United States History | Edward E. Baptist | |
| Humanities | United States History | Matt Delmont | |
| Humanities | United States History | Daniel K. Richter | |
| Humanities | United States History | Angela Zimmerman | |
| Natural Sciences | Astronomy and Astrophysics | Eric Agol | |
| Natural Sciences | Chemistry | Daniel Mindiola | |
| Natural Sciences | Chemistry | Richmond Sarpong | |
| Natural Sciences | Chemistry | Sara Skrabalak | |
| Natural Sciences | Earth Science | Cin-Ty Lee | |
| Natural Sciences | Engineering | Daniel Lidar | |
| Natural Sciences | Mathematics | Hee Oh | |
| Natural Sciences | Mathematics | Gigliola Staffilani | |
| Natural Sciences | Medicine and Health | Aydoğan Özcan | |
| Natural Sciences | Medicine and Health | Tim Roughgarden | |
| Natural Sciences | Medicine and Health | Teresa K. Woodruff | |
| Natural Sciences | Molecular and Cellular Biology | Ehab Abouheif | |
| Natural Sciences | Organismic Biology and Ecology | Armin Moczek | |
| Natural Sciences | Physics | B. Andrei Bernevig | |
| Natural Sciences | Science Writing | Kevin Davies | |
| Natural Sciences | Science Writing | Deborah Rudacille | |
| Natural Sciences | Statistics | David Blei | |
| Social Sciences | Anthropology and Cultural Studies | Heather Hurst | |
| Social Sciences | Anthropology and Cultural Studies | Cheryl Mattingly | |
| Social Sciences | Anthropology and Cultural Studies | Shalini Shankar | |
| Social Sciences | Anthropology and Cultural Studies | David Tavárez | |
| Social Sciences | Anthropology and Cultural Studies | Sarah Wagner | |
| Social Sciences | Anthropology and Cultural Studies | Natasha Warikoo | |
| Social Sciences | Constitutional Studies | Linda Colley | |
| Social Sciences | Economics | Ulrike Malmendier | |
| Social Sciences | Geography and Environmental Studies | Robin Broad | |
| Social Sciences | Geography and Environmental Studies | Julie Guthman | |
| Social Sciences | Law | Heidi Kitrosser | |
| Social Sciences | Law | Hiroshi Motomura | |
| Social Sciences | Political Science | Mark R. Beissinger | |
| Social Sciences | Political Science | Wendy Brown | |
| Social Sciences | Psychology | Tom Griffiths | |
| Social Sciences | Sociology | Gil Eyal | |
| Social Sciences | Sociology | Nancy Foner | |

== See also ==
- Guggenheim Fellowship
- List of Guggenheim Fellowships awarded in 2016
- List of Guggenheim Fellowships awarded in 2018
