= Alison Griffiths =

Alison Griffiths may refer to:

- Alison Griffiths (politician), British Member of Parliament
- Alison Griffiths (professor), British-American scholar of film history, visual studies, and media theory
