= Sabine Hyland =

American anthropologist (born 1964)

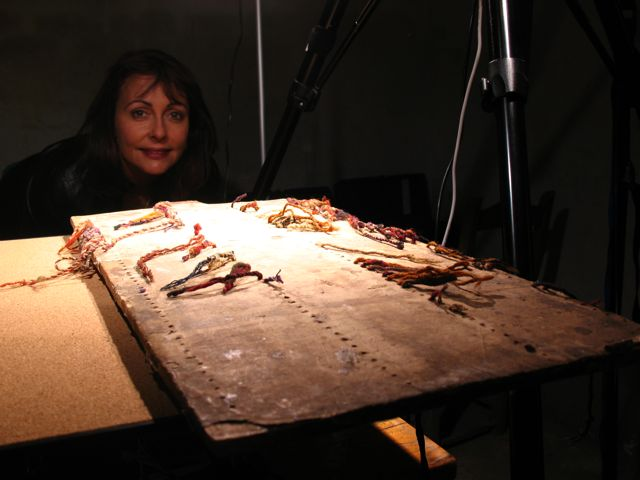
- Hyland with khipu board
- Born: August 26, 1964 (age 62); Cumberland, Maryland, US

Academic background
- Education: Cornell University (A.B.); Yale University (M.Phil., PhD)

Academic work
- Discipline: Anthropologist
- Sub-discipline: Andean ethnohistory
- Institutions: St. Norbert College; University of St Andrews

Sabine Hyland (born Campbell, August 26, 1964) is an American anthropologist and ethnohistorian working in the Andes. She is currently Professor of World Christianity at the University of St Andrews. She is best known for her work studying khipus and hybrid khipu-alphabetic texts in the Central Andes and is credited with the first potential phonetic decipherment of an element of a khipu. She has also written extensively about the interaction between Spanish missionaries and the Inca in colonial Peru, focusing on language, religion and missionary culture, as well as the history of the Chanka people.

Hyland's research has appeared in media outlets around the world, such as the BBC World Service, National Geographic, Scientific American, Slate, and The Atlantic. In 2011, National Geographic filmed a documentary about her research on khipu boards as part of their series Ancient X-Files.

== Life and career ==
=== Early life and education ===
Sabine Hyland was born in Maryland in 1964. She grew up in Dryden, New York, near Cornell University where her father, Joseph Kearns Campbell, was a Professor of Agricultural and Biological Engineering. Her mother Sigrid is a German immigrant to the United States. Sabine spent some of her formative years abroad when her father was working at the International Rice Research Institute in the Philippines and the International Potato Center in Lima. The year she spent living in Lima as a teenager sparked her interest in studying Peru.

Hyland received her first degree in Anthropology from Cornell in 1986, graduating magna cum laude with distinction and Phi Beta Kappa. She also studied Quechua at Cornell. She earned a PhD in Anthropology from Yale University in 1994, where she was supervised by Richard Burger and also studied under Mike Coe and John Middleton. Her doctoral thesis on the subject of Jesuit Blas Valera was later reworked into her first monograph, The Jesuit and the Incas: The Extraordinary Life of Padre Blas Valera, S.J. (2003).

Sabine married fellow academic William Hyland in 1989. They have two children, Margaret and Eleanor.

=== Career ===
After working at Yale as a teaching assistant, Hyland held subsequent positions at Conception Seminary College in Kansas and Columbus State University in Georgia during the 1990s, teaching Latin American missionary history and anthropology. In 1999 she was appointed as Assistant Professor of Anthropology at St. Norbert College in De Pere, Wisconsin, where she later achieved the rank of Associate Professor. She became a member of the American Anthropological Association and the American Society for Ethnohistory. While teaching at St. Norbert, she published widely on Peruvian ethnohistory and religion.

Although she had always been interested in khipus and the possibility that they could be decoded, it was during this period that a desire to understand more about how khipus encoded information began to guide her research interests. In 2011, she was contacted by Rebeca Arcayo Aguado, a schoolteacher in Mangas, about a khipu board that had been kept in the local church. This board had a khipu cord associated with each Spanish name, making it an example of a hybrid khipu-alphabetic text. Funded by the National Geographic Society, Hyland travelled to Mangas to study the khipu. Her research on khipu boards, a herding khipu collected by Max Uhle in 1895, and other khipus surviving in Andean communities led her to argue that the ply direction of knots on khipu cords and the colour of the fibre were significant ways of encoding meaning in khipus.

Aside from her khipu studies, Hyland also worked on the history of the Chanka with archaeologist Brian S. Bauer. In 2004, she was honoured by Miguel Suarez Contreras, the head of the Chanka nation, as an honorary member of the Chanka nation in thanks for her work "on behalf of the Chanka people". She also continued working on historical texts about the Inca, publishing an edition of the Quito Manuscript, a text on Inca history preserved by Fernando de Montesinos, and an edition of Blas Valera's work called Gods of the Andes: An Early Jesuit Account of Inca Religion and Andean Christianity (2011).

In 2012, Sabine Hyland was appointed as a Reader in Social Anthropology at the University of St Andrews, later promoted to Professor in 2018. She served for five years as the Director of the Centre for Amerindian Studies. Her research into khipu epistles which were used in the Andes as part of rebellions against the Spanish government in the 18th century led her to argue that these khipu "letters" contained phonetic representations of the ayllus, or community lineages, who sent and received them. This information was encoded through colour, animal fibre, and ply direction. This revelation was the first potential decipherment of an element in a khipu since Leslie Leland Locke decoded how khipus recorded numbers in 1923. In 2024, Hyland and Peruvian museum curator Victor Margarito documented the longest khipu in the Andean village of Jucul. The Jucul khipu is similar to the calendrical khipu in the nearby village of Rapaz.

Hyland's research about khipus has featured in documentaries made by National Geographic and Discovery Channel. She has also served as a consultant for television and appeared on History Channel's series Mankind: The Story of All of Us. In 2018 she was interviewed on the BBC World Service. She has won several grants from institutions such as the Leverhulme Trust and the National Endowment for the Humanities, and she was made a Fellow of the John Simon Guggenheim Memorial Foundation in 2019 after receiving a grant for her project "Hidden Texts of the Andes: Deciphering the Cord Writing of Peru". The work of Hyland and other researchers to decipher the khipus has been compared to a search for an Inca "Rosetta Stone" and seeks to reframe the question of whether indigenous American societies other than the Maya had writing systems, and what it means to have a "three-dimensional writing system" recorded through textile.

== Selected works ==
- 2003: The Jesuit and the Incas: The Extraordinary Life of Padre Blas Valera, S.J.
- 2007: The Quito Manuscript: An Inca History Preserved by Fernando de Montesinos
- 2008: El manuscrito de Quito: Una historia de los Incas preservada por Fernando de Montesinos
- 2011: Gods of the Andes: An Early Jesuit Account of Inca Religion and Andean Christianity
- 2016: The Chankas and the Priest: A Tale of Murder and Exile in Highland Peru
