= Deborah Rudacille =

American journalist and science writer (born 1958)

- Born: July 1958 (age 68); Dundalk, Maryland, U.S.
- Education: Loyola College (BA); Johns Hopkins University (MA)
- Occupations: Journalist and author
- Website: deborahrudacille.com

Deborah Rudacille (born July 1958) is an American journalist and science writer. She has worked as a news editor for the Simons Foundation Autism Research Initiative in New York, and in May 2012 became Professor of the Practice in journalism at the University of Maryland, Baltimore County. In April 2017, Rudacille was awarded a Guggenheim Fellowship in Science Writing for a project titled "The Family Disease: Alcoholism, Addiction and Inheritance."

Rudacille is the author of The Scalpel and the Butterfly (2000), a history of the practice and politics of animal testing, The Riddle of Gender (2004), which examines scientists' attempts to define gender and the effect that had on transgender people, and Roots of Steel (2010), about the history of the Bethlehem Steel Corporation steelworks in Sparrows Point, Maryland.

The Scalpel and the Butterfly was chosen by the Los Angeles Times as one of the year's best non-fiction books, and The Riddle of Gender was nominated for a Lambda Literary Award.

== Background ==
Rudacille was born in Dundalk, Maryland into a working-class family with a long history of working for the local steelmill, including her father and his brothers, her grandfather and her great-grandfather. Her mother worked for the United Steel Workers labor union. Her maternal grandparents were first generation Italian-American immigrants who arrived during World War II, while her paternal grandparents had arrived in the 1920s.

She attended Our Lady of Hope elementary school and The Catholic High School of Baltimore. She obtained her BA in 1980 from Loyola College and her MA in 1998 from the Writing Seminars program at Johns Hopkins University, where she specialized in science writing. In May 2012, she joined the English department at the University of Maryland, Baltimore County, as Professor of the Practice. She teaches courses on science and medical writing, community journalism in the digital age, and the history of medical attempts to define gender and alcoholism.

== Selected works ==
- with Joanne Zurlo and Alan M. Goldberg. Animals and Alternatives in Testing: History, Science, Ethics. Mary Ann Liebert, 1994, ISBN 0913113670
- The Scalpel and the Butterfly: The War Between Animal Research and Animal Protection. Farrar, Straus & Giroux, 2000.
- The Riddle of Gender: Science, Activism and Transgender Rights. Pantheon Books, 2004.
- Roots of Steel: Boom and Bust in an American Mill Town. Pantheon, 2010.
- "Baltimore Blues", Baltimore Style, November 2008.
- "Working-class USA, R.I.P.", USA Today, 7 April 2010.
