= Peter Burr =

American artist

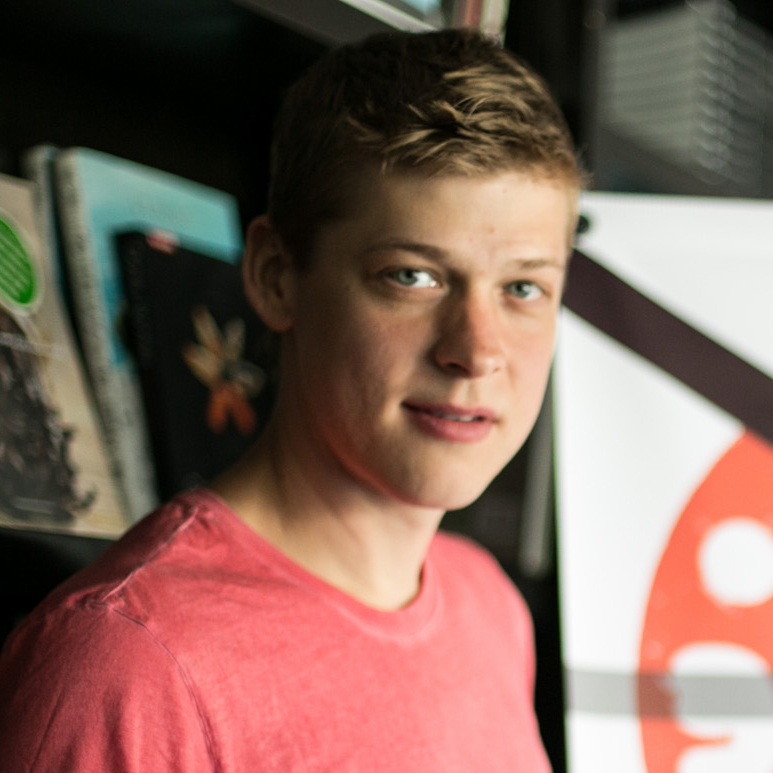
- Burr in 2014
- Born: 1980 (age 45–46); Brooklyn, New York, United States
- Education: Carnegie Mellon University
- Occupations: Digital artist, new media artist
- Known for: Animation, installation art

Peter Burr (born 1980) is an American digital and new media artist. He specializes in animation and installation. He was also a touring member of the collective MOBILIVRE-BOOKMOBILE; and founded the video production company, Cartune Xprez. He is based in Brooklyn, New York.

== Career ==
Peter Burr was born in 1980 in Brooklyn, New York. He received a BFA from Carnegie Mellon University in 2002.

He has been awarded a Guggenheim Fellowship (2018), a Sundance New Frontier Story Lab Fellowship (2016), a Creative Capital Award (2016), and film/video prizes at the International Film Festival Rotterdam, among others. He was an artist-in-residence at MacDowell Colony and the Bemis Center for Contemporary Arts.

His work has been exhibited at The Whitney Museum of American Art, The Museum of Modern Art, 3-Legged Dog in New York, San Francisco Cinematheque's experimental festival CROSSROADS, Supernova Digital Animation Festival in Denver, Documenta 14 in Athens, and Centre Pompidou in Paris.

In 2005, he founded the video label and touring animation roadshow Cartune Xprez. In 2015, he was named one of the "best unrepresented artists." by The AFC.

== Works ==
Burr's works integrate video game design into new media and digital art. His projects often blend cinema with interactive elements to explore themes of alienation, urbanism, and the social influence of internet technologies. Special Effect is a live cinema performance that was presented at 50 different venues across the world from 2012 to 2014. Cave Exits is an art installation described as a living structure inside a 4-channel video cube, premiering at the Images Festival in Toronto in 2015. He continued that collaboration with an interactive artwork entitled Dirtscraper that premiered at the inaugural exhibition of the ICA at VCU. The project employs the "video game concept of an endlessly mutating death labyrinth," exploring themes of alienated feminine bodies and feral architecture. Peter and Porpentine were commissioned by Rhizome to continue that body of work through a Virtual Reality piece. The result of that commission was the project Arcology, a "portrait of a woman navigating a living labyrinth."

In May 2018, Burr's ongoing work Pattern Language was exhibited at Times Square as the monthly installment of the Midnight Moments series. The display involved digital art on advertising screens.

In January, 2021, his project Responsive Eye was exhibited at Telematic Media Arts and Minnesota Street Project. It is a collection of multimedia artworks that examine ways we endure contemporary life in gridded simulations.

In December, 2022, his artwork Boom Town launched at Feral File. It explores the cyclical nature of boom and bust economies within virtual landscapes.

In July, 2023, His project Sunshine Monument premiered at The Whitney Museum. It is an exploration of dystopian themes through architectural constructs within virtual spaces reflecting on the museum structure that houses it both literally and symbolically.

== Works ==
- Sunshine Monument (2023)
- Boom Town (2022)
- Black Square (2020)
- Dirtscraper (2018)
- Pattern Language (2016)
- The Mess (2016)
- Cave Exits (2015)
- Special Effect (2012)
- Green I Red (2012)
- Alone With The Moon (2012)

== Awards ==
- Guggenheim Fellowship (2018)
- Brooklyn Art Fund Grant (2017)
- Creative Capital Award in Emerging Fields (2016)
- Sundance Institute's New Frontier Story Lab Fellowship (2016)
- Supernova Digital Arts Festival Grand Prize (2016)
- 25FPS International Experimental Film/Video Festival Critics Choice Award and Critics Jury Award (2016)
- NYFA Fellowship (2015)
