= The Star Thrower =

Short story by Loren Eiseley

"The Star Thrower" (or "starfish story") is part of a 26-page essay of the same name by Loren Eiseley (1907–1977), published in 1969 in The Unexpected Universe. The Star Thrower is also the title of a 1978 anthology of Eiseley's works (including the essay), which he completed shortly before his death.

== The original story ==
The story describes the narrator walking along the beach early one morning in the pre-dawn twilight, when he sees a man picking up a starfish off the sand and throwing it into the sea. The narrator is observant and subtle, but skeptical; he has seen many "collectors" on the beach, killing countless sea creatures for their shells. Some excerpts:

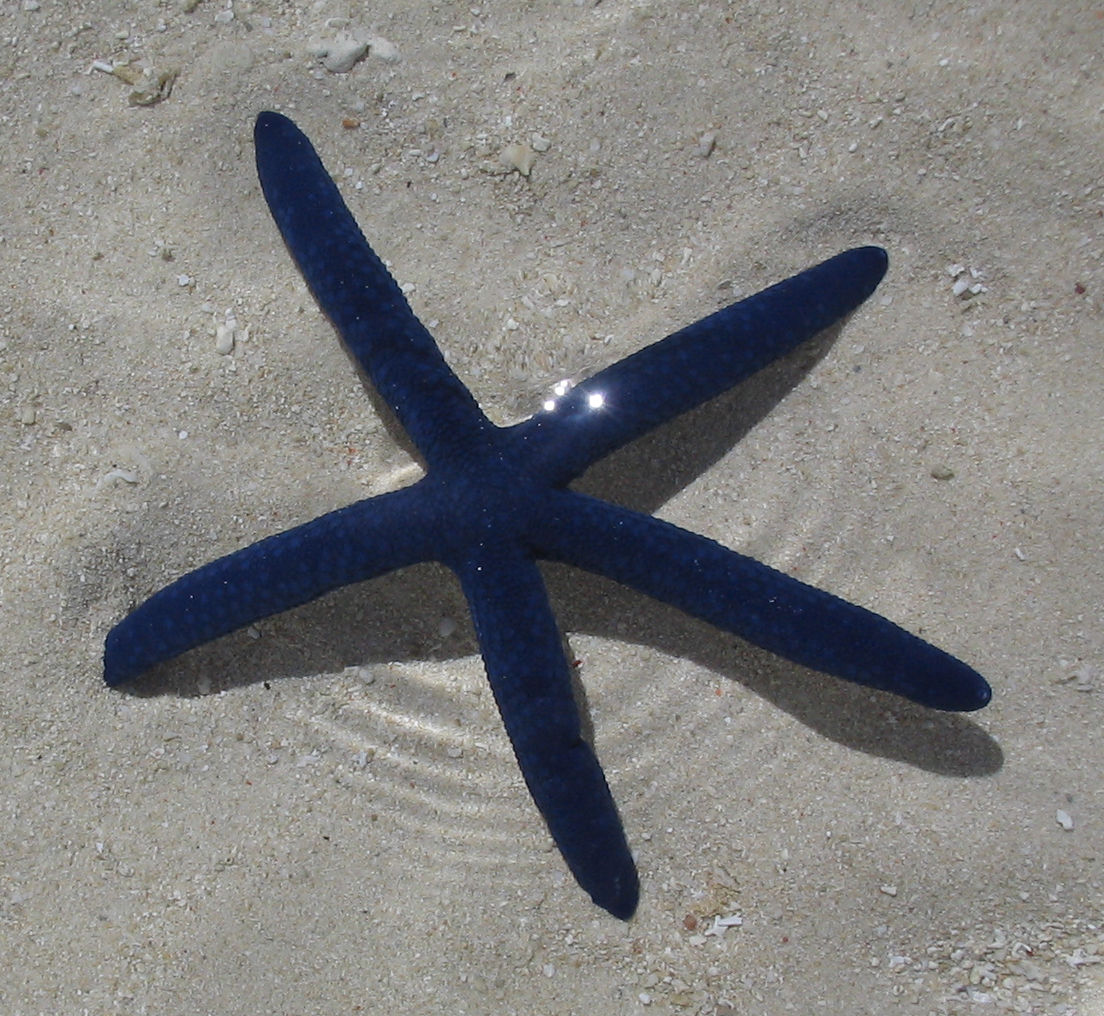

In a pool of sand and silt a starfish had thrust its arms up stiffly and was holding its body away from the stifling mud.

"It's still alive," I ventured.

"Yes," he said, and with a quick yet gentle movement he picked up the star and spun it over my head and far out into the sea. It sunk in a burst of spume, and the waters roared once more.

..."There are not many who come this far," I said, groping in a sudden embarrassment for words. "Do you collect?"

"Only like this," he said softly, gesturing amidst the wreckage of the shore. "And only for the living." He stooped again, oblivious of my curiosity, and skipped another star neatly across the water. "The stars," he said, "throw well. One can help them."

..."I do not collect," I said uncomfortably, the wind beating at my garments. "Neither the living nor the dead. I gave it up a long time ago. Death is the only successful collector."

— The Star Thrower, p. 172

Later, after some thoughts on our relationships to other animals and to the universe, the narrator returns to the beach:

..."On a point of land, I found the star thrower...I spoke once briefly. "I understand," I said. "Call me another thrower." Only then I allowed myself to think, He is not alone any longer. After us, there will be others...Perhaps far outward on the rim of space a genuine star was similarly seized and flung...For a moment, we cast on an infinite beach together beside an unknown hurler of suns... We had lost our way, I thought, but we had kept, some of us, the memory of the perfect circle of compassion from life to death and back to life again." —The Star Thrower, p.181

== The story as adapted ==
The story has been adapted and retold by motivational speakers and on internet sites, often without attribution, since at least the mid-1980s. In this version the conversation is related between other characters, an older man and a younger one, a wise man and a little girl, or Jesus and a man.

It appears unattributed in a 1991 novel by Dan Millman, in which a spiritual seeker asks his wise teacher, "[t]here are so many – how can [throwing each starfish back in the water] make any difference?" She replies, "It makes a difference to this one."

It was also adapted into a children's story in 2006. Called, "Sara and the Starfish," it re-tells the story from the eyes of a young girl as well as the starfish itself, though the moral of the story is the same as the original idea told by Eiseley.

The story is referenced in the novel The Marriage Pact by Michelle Richmond.

== Adaptation for charity campaigns ==
An old man had a habit of early morning walks on the beach. One day, after a storm, he saw a human figure in the distance moving like a dancer. As he came closer he saw that it was a young woman and she was not dancing but was reaching down to the sand, picking up a starfish and very gently throwing them into the ocean.

"Young lady," he asked, "Why are you throwing starfish into the ocean?"

"The sun is up, and the tide is going out, and if I do not throw them in they will die."

"But young lady, do you not realise that there are miles and miles of beach and starfish all along it? You cannot possibly make a difference."

The young woman listened politely, paused and then bent down, picked up another starfish and threw it into the sea, past the breaking waves, saying: "It made a difference for that one."

The old man looked at the young woman inquisitively and thought about what she had done. Inspired, he joined her in throwing starfish back into the sea. Soon others joined, and all the starfish were saved.

== Publication data ==
- The Unexpected Universe (1969, Harcourt, Brace and World ISBN 0-15-692850-7)
- Survival Printout (1973, Vintage Books ISBN 0-394-71857-7)
- The Star Thrower (1978, Times Books (Random House) hardcover: ISBN 0-8129-0746-9, 1979 Harvest/HBJ paperback: ISBN 0-15-684909-7, Sagebrush library/school binding: ISBN 1-4176-1867-1); introduction by W. H. Auden
