= Brad Temkin =

American photographer (born 1956)

Brad Temkin (born 1956 in Chicago) is an American photographer. He is known for his photographs documenting the human impact on the landscape.

== Career ==
Temkin has taught photography at Columbia College Chicago since 1984.

Temkin's first book, Private Places: Photographs of Chicago Gardens, was published in 2005. In 2009, he began a project entitled Rooftop, addressing what contemporary urban pioneers are doing to mitigate the consequences of non-renewable energy consumption and drawing attention to living architecture.

Temkin's works are included in the permanent collections of the Art Institute of Chicago and Museum of Contemporary Photography.

== Publications ==
- Private Places: Photographs of Chicago Gardens, Center for American Places/Columbia College, Chicago. 2005.
- Rooftop, Radius Books, New Mexico, 2015
- The State of Water, Radius Books, New Mexico, 2019. ISBN 978-1-942185-55-0

== Collections ==
Temkin's work is held in the following permanent public collections:

- Art Institute of Chicago
- Museum of Contemporary Photography
