= Scott C. Johnson =

American author and journalist

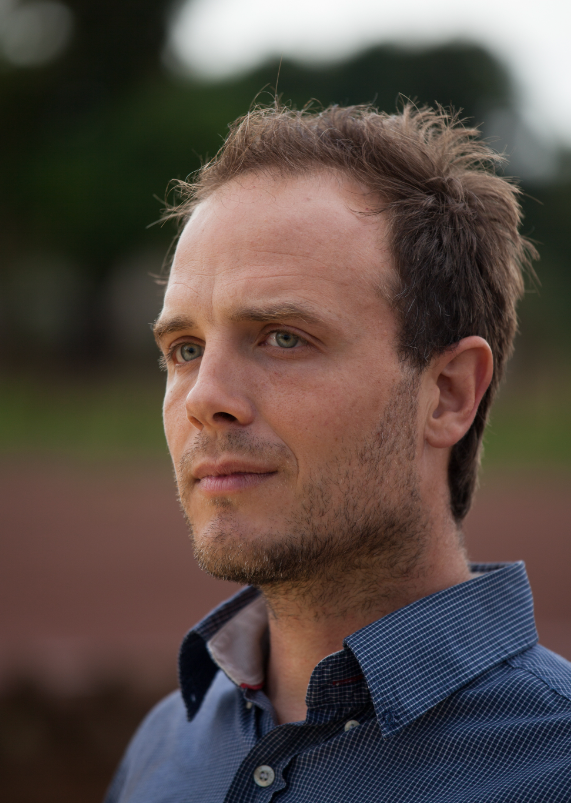
An image of author Scott C. Johnson

Scott C. Johnson (born July 31, 1973) is an American author and journalist.

== Early life and education ==
Johnson obtained a B.A from the University of Washington, where he studied Comparative Literature and Comparative History of Ideas. He also studied Arabic in Fez, Morocco. Johnson began his journalism career as an intern in Newsweek's Paris bureau. He eventually became a Special Correspondent and worked on a wide range of topics, including Mad Cow Disease, Pedophilia, European agriculture and the war in Kosovo.

== Career ==
For twelve years Johnson worked as a Newsweek foreign correspondent and Bureau Chief, reporting from more than fifty countries His writing has also appeared in Foreign Policy, New York Times, BuzzFeed, Guernica Magazine, Granta and various other outlets.

In May 2013, W W Norton published Johnson's first book, a memoir entitled "The Wolf and the Watchman: A Father, A Son and the CIA." In September 2013, "The Wolf and the Watchman" was placed on the Long List for the National Book Award The book was also named a Washington Post Notable Book of 2013

After September 11, 2001, Johnson reported from Afghanistan for several months before moving to Mexico City in 2002 where he was appointed Bureau Chief. In 2004, Johnson was awarded an Overseas Press Club honorable mention for his reporting on economics in Latin America.

In 2003 Johnson began reporting on the American invasion of Iraq. From 2005–2007 he was the magazine's Baghdad Bureau Chief. In addition to the invasion, Johnson covered the hunt for Saddam Hussein as well as his eventual execution; Iraqi politics and American diplomatic and military efforts. Johnson was the first American print journalist to spend time with Iraqi insurgents, during the summer of 2003. For his reporting from Iraq, Johnson shared in Newsweek's National Magazine Award for General Excellence in 2004.

In 2007, Johnson was named Newsweek's Africa Bureau Chief. In addition to South African news, he covered wars in Congo and Somalia, electoral violence in Kenya, Chinese influence in Angola and the deterioration of Zimbabwe.

From September 2010 to June 2013, Johnson was named the Violence Reporting Fellow at the California Endowment where he reported from Oakland, CA for the Bay Area News Group. His work garnered several journalism awards, notably from the California Newspaper Association and the Society of Professional Journalists Nor-Cal. His article "How a War Hero Became a Serial Bank Robber" was named one of BuzzFeed's Most Harrowing Stories of 2013.

In 2023, HarperCollins released his book The Con Queen of Hollywood: The Hunt for an Evil Genius.

He is represented by Aevitas Creative Management.
