= Mahwish Chishty =

Pakistani-American artist (born 1980)

- Born: 1980 (age 45–46); Lahore, Pakistan
- Education: National College of Arts; University of Maryland, College Park
- Employer: University of Maryland, College Park; Kent State University; University of Massachusetts Amherst
- Awards: Guggenheim Fellow (2017)
- Website: mahachishty.com

Mahwish Kamran Chishty (born 1980) is a Pakistani-American artist who works in painting and installation art. A 2017 Guggenheim Fellow, she is also currently Associate Professor at the University of Massachusetts Amherst.

== Biography ==
Mahwish Kamran Chishty was born in 1980 in Lahore, Pakistan, and raised in Saudi Arabia. Originally trained in Mughal painting and Persian miniature, she was educated at the National College of Arts, where she studied miniature painting and got her BFA in 2004, and the University of Maryland, College Park (UMD), where she got her MFA in Studio Arts in 2008. After remaining briefly at UMD as a teaching assistant (2006-2008; 2011-2012), she later taught as a lecturer at Montgomery College (2011-2013) and George Washington University (2012-2013), before moving to the School of the Art Institute of Chicago (2013-2016) and Harold Washington College (2014-2016). In 2016, she became an assistant professor at Kent State University, and in 2019 she became an associate professor at University of Massachusetts Amherst.

Chishty's work includes installation art and paintings. Her work was part of the 2004 exhibition Contemporary Miniature Paintings from Pakistan at Fukuoka Asian Art Museum. In 2015, she was a City of Chicago Department of Cultural Affairs and Special Events Artist-in-Residence at the Chicago Cultural Center, as well as a Yaddo fellow. In 2016, she had a solo exhibition at the Imperial War Museum, focusing on the impact of drone strikes in Pakistan, particularly the region around the Durand Line, and drawing inspiration from truck art in South Asia. Matt Breen of Time Out London gave it four out of five stars, saying that "these glittering, troubling little conundrums ask questions about what role art can play in a world beset by violence and war". She was awarded a Guggenheim Fellowship in 2017. Her work is in the permanent collections of the Fukuoka Asian Art Museum and Imperial War Museum.

She holds American and Pakistani dual citizenship.
