= Julie Guthman =

American geographer and food studies scholar

- Born: 1957 (age 68–69) (Note: Stated in her Library of Congress Name Authority File, n2003009394)
- Citizenship: American
- Occupations: Geographer, food studies scholar, professor
- Title: Distinguished Professor of Sociology Emerita
- Awards: Guggenheim Fellowship (2017) rances B. Cashin Fellowship, Radcliffe Institute for Advanced Study (2017); AAG Meridian Book Award (2020)

Academic background
- Education: University of California, Santa Cruz (BA); University of California, Berkeley (MBA, MA, PhD)
- Thesis: Agrarian Dreams? The Paradox of Organic Farming in California (2000)
- Doctoral advisor: Michael J. Watts

Academic work
- Discipline: Geography
- Sub-discipline: Political ecology, food studies, agrarian studies, science and technology studies
- Institutions: University of California, Santa Cruz
- Main interests: Agroecology and agriculture; food and nutrition; capitalism; California history; environmental studies
- Notable works: Agrarian Dreams (2004); Weighing In (2011); Wilted (2019); The Problem with Solutions (2024)

Julie Harriet Guthman (born 1957) is an American geographer and Distinguished Professor of Sociology Emerita at the University of California, Santa Cruz. Her work has dealt with the political economy of California agriculture, the certification and limits of organic farming, the politics of obesity, the chemical and biological foundations of the California strawberry industry, and the Silicon Valley-based tech forays into food and agriculture. She is the author of five books with the University of California Press, including Agrarian Dreams: The Paradox of Organic Farming in California (2004), Weighing In: Obesity, Food Justice, and the Limits of Capitalism (2011), Wilted: Pathogens, Chemicals, and the Fragile Future of the Strawberry Industry (2019), and The Problem with Solutions: Why Silicon Valley Can't Hack the Future of Food (2024). Guthman held a John Simon Guggenheim Memorial Foundation fellowship and a Radcliffe Institute for Advanced Study fellowship at Harvard University in 2017–2018.

== Early life and education ==
Guthman has described her father as a "health-food advocate" of the 1950s and 1960s who imposed strict dietary rules at home. She told the Harvard Gazette that as a child she would visit friends' houses to eat the junk food forbidden in her own. She received a BA in sociology from the University of California, Santa Cruz in 1979.

After her undergraduate degree, Guthman worked in California progressive politics and the nonprofit sector, including a period in 1981–1982 as Northern California Director of the Nuclear Weapons Freeze Campaign and several years through 1985 in administrative and fundraising roles at the Oakland-based voter-mobilization group Voting P.O.W.E.R. She earned an MBA at the Haas School of Business in 1988 and worked afterwards as a financial administrator for the public broadcaster KQED in San Francisco and as fiscal manager for the Child Care Coordinating Council of San Mateo County. A trip to Southeast Asia, Guthman has said, redirected her interest toward agriculture and prompted a return to UC Berkeley for graduate study. She earned an MA in geography in 1995, with a thesis on environmental crisis discourse in Nepal, and a PhD in geography in 2000. Her doctoral dissertation, Agrarian Dreams? The Paradox of Organic Farming in California, was supervised by Michael J. Watts and became the basis of her first book.

== Career ==
=== Early academic appointments ===
Guthman was a Kevin Starr Postdoctoral Fellow in California Studies at the University of California Humanities Research Institute in 2000. Between 2001 and 2003 she lectured at UC Berkeley in the departments of Geography and of Environmental Science, Policy and Management.

=== University of California, Santa Cruz ===
Guthman joined UC Santa Cruz as an assistant professor in the Department of Community Studies in 2003, a program that revolves on students conducting in-depth field studies with social justice and social change organizations. She was promoted to associate professor in 2007 and to full professor in 2012. She was named Distinguished Professor in 2024 and as of 2026 holds the title Distinguished Professor of Sociology Emerita, with affiliations in the Community Studies Program, the Department of Sociology, and the Department of Environmental Studies.

In April 2017 she was awarded a Guggenheim Fellowship to support a book project on the soil pathogen Verticillium dahliae and the California strawberry industry. She held the Guggenheim concurrently with the 2017–2018 Frances B. Cashin Fellowship at the Radcliffe Institute for Advanced Study at Harvard University.

=== Editor ===
Guthman has co-edited the University of California Press book series Critical Environments: Nature, Science, and Politics since 2012 and has served as associate editor of California Agriculture since 2019. She sits on the editorial boards of Antipode (since 2014), the Journal of Peasant Studies (international advisory board, since 2018), Environment and Planning F (inaugural editorial board, since 2021), and Food and Society: New Directions published by Bristol University Press (inaugural editorial board, since 2023).

== Research and work ==
Agrarian Dreams: The Paradox of Organic Farming in California (first published in 2004 and a second edition appeared in 2014) was based on Guthman's doctoral research and on interviews with California organic growers. She argues that the institutional dynamics of certification and the historical legacies of California agriculture have produced an organic sector resembling (rather than diverging from) the conventional industry it was originally meant to challenge.

In Weighing In: Obesity, Food Justice, and the Limits of Capitalism (2011), she questioned the framing of obesity as a problem to be addressed by promoting local and organic food. An emphasis on consumer choice draws attention away from production-side regulation and from the possible role of environmental contaminants. She told UC Santa Cruz News that "food needs to be regulated at the point of production, not consumption" and that "the way statistics are constructed and presented tend to overstate the problem."

The New Food Activism: Opposition, Cooperation, and Collective Action (2017), co-edited with Alison Hope Alkon, gathered work on movements that go beyond market-based food choices.

Wilted: Pathogens, Chemicals, and the Fragile Future of the Strawberry Industry (2019) drew on fieldwork that included interviews with seventy-five growers, fifty workers, and dozens of industry representatives. Guthman traces the entanglement of soil pathogens, plant breeding, fumigant chemistry, land tenure, and labor in the California strawberry sector. Guthman has summarized the argument by saying that fumigants such as methyl bromide "were the glue that held it all together."

In her book, The Problem with Solutions: Why Silicon Valley Can't Hack the Future of Food (2024), Guthman contends that food insecurity and the environmental costs of agriculture are social and political problems rather than technical ones, and that venture-backed agri-food technology firms have repeatedly framed inventions as solutions to narrowly defined problems. Guthman told UC Santa Cruz News that "I'm not against technology, but we can't start there to look for solutions" and that "food insecurity is rarely ever a problem of food production. It's more about inability to gain access to food."

Guthman has been leading the Science and Technology Studies Food and Agriculture Network (STSFAN) since 2019.

== Reception and critics ==
In its 2020 citation for the Meridian Book Award for Outstanding Scholarly Work in Geography, the American Association of Geographers described Wilted as "a Silent Spring for our present moment" and as "an empirically grounded clarion call to fundamentally reorganize how we produce food, conduct research, and organize land and labor markets." In 2023 the association's Cultural and Political Ecology Specialty Group named Guthman the recipient of its Distinguished Career Award; the nomination letter, quoted by UC Santa Cruz News, stated that her work had "profoundly influenced the way we understand how capitalism has reshaped U.S. and global food systems" and that her publications had "become standard reading in both critical agrarian studies and food studies."

== Awards and honors ==
- 2023 — Distinguished Career Award, Cultural and Political Ecology Specialty Group, American Association of Geographers
- 2022 — Martin M. Chemers Award for Outstanding Research, Division of Social Sciences, UC Santa Cruz
- 2020 — Meridian Book Award for Outstanding Scholarly Work in Geography, American Association of Geographers (for Wilted)
- 2017 — Guggenheim Fellowship, John Simon Guggenheim Memorial Foundation
- 2017 — Frances B. Cashin Fellowship, Radcliffe Institute for Advanced Study, Harvard University
- 2016 — Academic residency, Rockefeller Foundation Bellagio Center
- 2015 — Excellence in Research Award, Agriculture, Food and Human Values Society
- 2012 — ASFS Book Award, Association for the Study of Food and Society (for Weighing In)
- 2012 — James E. Blaut Award for Innovative Publication, Cultural and Political Ecology Specialty Group, American Association of Geographers (for Weighing In)
- 2011 — C. Wright Mills Award finalist, Society for the Study of Social Problems (for Weighing In)
- 2009 — Donald Q. Innis Award, Rural Geography Specialty Group, American Association of Geographers (for Agrarian Dreams)
- 2007 — Frederick H. Buttel Award for Outstanding Scholarly Achievement, Rural Sociological Society (for Agrarian Dreams)
- 2005 — Ashby Prize, Environment and Planning A (for the paper "Back to the Land")

== Selected bibliography ==
=== Books ===
- Guthman, Julie (2024). The Problem with Solutions: Why Silicon Valley Can't Hack the Future of Food. Berkeley: University of California Press. ISBN 9780520402676.
- Guthman, Julie (2019). Wilted: Pathogens, Chemicals, and the Fragile Future of the Strawberry Industry. Berkeley: University of California Press. ISBN 9780520973343
- Alkon, Alison Hope; Guthman, Julie, eds. (2017). The New Food Activism: Opposition, Cooperation, and Collective Action. Berkeley: University of California Press. ISBN 9780520292147
- Guthman, Julie (2014). Agrarian Dreams: The Paradox of Organic Farming in California (2nd ed.). Berkeley: University of California Press. ISBN 9780520959132
- Guthman, Julie (2011). Weighing In: Obesity, Food Justice, and the Limits of Capitalism. Berkeley: University of California Press. ISBN 9780520266247
- Guthman, Julie (2004). Agrarian Dreams: The Paradox of Organic Farming in California. Berkeley: University of California Press. ISBN 9780520240940

=== Journal articles ===
- Guthman, Julie, and Becky Mansfield. "The implications of environmental epigenetics: A new direction for geographic inquiry on health, space, and nature-society relations." Progress in human geography 37, no. 4 (2013): 486-504.
- Guthman, Julie. "If they only knew." The unbearable whiteness of alternative food. In AH Alkon & J. Agyeman (Eds.), Cultivating food justice: Race, class and sustainability (2011): 263-281.
- Guthman, Julie. "Teaching the politics of obesity: Insights into neoliberal embodiment and contemporary biopolitics." Antipode 41, no. 5 (2009): 1110-1133.
- Guthman, Julie. "Bringing good food to others: Investigating the subjects of alternative food practice." Cultural geographies15, no. 4 (2008): 431-447.
- Guthman, Julie. "Neoliberalism and the making of food politics in California." Geoforum 39, no. 3 (2008): 1171-1183.
- Guthman, Julie, and Melanie DuPuis. "Embodying neoliberalism: economy, culture, and the politics of fat."
- Guthman, Julie. "“If they only knew”: Color blindness and universalism in California alternative food institutions." The professional geographer 60, no. 3 (2008): 387-397.
- Guthman, Julie. "The Polanyian way? Voluntary food labels as neoliberal governance." Antipode 39, no. 3 (2007): 456-478.
- Environment and planning D: Society and Space 24, no. 3 (2006): 427-448.
- Guthman, Julie. "Commodified meanings, meaningful commodities: Re–thinking production–consumption links through the organic system of provision." Sociologia ruralis 42, no. 4 (2002): 295-311.
