= Jessica Silbey =

American legal scholar

- Occupations: Legal scholar; lawyer
- Awards: Guggenheim Fellowship (2018)

Academic background
- Education: Stanford University (BA); University of Michigan (PhD); University of Michigan Law School (JD)
- Thesis: The subjects of trial films (1999)

Academic work
- Sub-discipline: Constitutional law; intellectual property law; technology law
- Institutions: Suffolk University Law School; Northeastern University School of Law; Boston University School of Law

Jessica Margaret Silbey is an American legal scholar. Originally a lawyer for Foley Hoag, she has worked as a law professor at Suffolk University Law School, Northeastern University School of Law, and Boston University School of Law, where she is also Frank R. Kenison Distinguished Scholar in Law. She is a 2018 Guggenheim Fellow, and is author of The Eureka Myth (2015) and Against Progress (2022).

== Biography ==
Silbey obtained a BA from Stanford University and a PhD in comparative literature from the University of Michigan. Her doctoral dissertation was The subjects of trial films. She also obtained a JD from University of Michigan Law School and served as a law clerk for district judge Robert Keeton and circuit judge Levin H. Campbell. She worked as a lawyer for Foley Hoag's Boston office, with her fields being in bankruptcy, intellectual property, and reproductive rights.

Silbey became an assistant professor of law at Suffolk University Law School in 2004, before being promoted to associate professor in 2007 and full professor in 2011. She moved to Northeastern University School of Law in 2015 and Boston University School of Law in 2020, serving as a law professor in both institutions. She chaired the Association of American Law Schools' intellectual property section and, from 2015 to 2018, co-chaired the Copyright Society's New England chapter.

Silbey specializes in constitutional law, intellectual property law, and technology law. She is author of The Eureka Myth: Creators, Innovators and Everyday Intellectual Property (2015) and Against Progress: Intellectual Property and Fundamental Values (2022), and has co-edited numerous volumes. She is the co-editor of several books, with many of them being within the field of law in popular culture. In 2018, she was awarded a Guggenheim Fellowship in Law.

== Works ==
- (ed. with Peter Robson) Law and Justice on the Small Screen (2012)
- The Eureka Myth: Creators, Innovators, and Everyday Intellectual Property (2015) (Note: Reviews of this book:)
- (ed. with Austin Sarat and Martha Umphrey) Trial Films on Trial (2019)
- (ed. with Michael Asimow) Law and Popular Culture: A Course Book (2020)
- Against Progress: Intellectual Property and Fundamental Values (2022)
- (ed. with Tom Burke and Lief Carter) Reason in Law (2026)
