= Heidi Kitrosser =

American legal scholar

- Occupations: Legal scholar; lawyer
- Awards: Guggenheim Fellowship (2017)

Academic background
- Education: University of California, Los Angeles (BA); Yale Law School (JD)

Academic work
- Sub-discipline: Constitutional law
- Institutions: Brooklyn Law School; University of Minnesota Law School; Pritzker School of Law

Heidi Kitrosser is an American legal scholar. Originally a lawyer for Jenner & Block, she became a professor at Brooklyn Law School, University of Minnesota Law School, and Pritzker School of Law, where she is also William W. Gurley Professor of Law. A 2017 Guggenheim Fellow, she specializes in constitutional law and free speech, and is author of Reclaiming Accountability (2014).

== Biography ==
Kitrosser obtained a BA summa cum laude in political science from University of California, Los Angeles (where she was a Phi Beta Kappa member) in 1992. After obtaining a JD from Yale Law School in 1996, she worked as a law clerk for district judge William J. Rea and circuit judge Judith W. Rogers. She was later hired as a lawyer, working at Jenner & Block's Washington, D.C. office.

In 2003, Kitrosser became an assistant professor at Brooklyn Law School. In 2006, she joined University of Minnesota Law School, where she was later appointed Robbins Kaplan Professor of Law. She later moved to Northwestern University's Pritzker School of Law, where she was Newton N. Minow Visiting Professor of Law and Pritzker Visiting Professor of Law before becoming William W. Gurley Professor of Law in 2022. She has served as a board member for the Minnesota Coalition for Government Information and Public Record Media.

Kitrosser specializes in constitutional law, including federal government secrecy, free speech, and separation of powers. In 2014, she published her book Reclaiming Accountability: Transparency, Executive Power through University of Chicago Press; she won the Roy C. Palmer Civil Liberties Prize for that book the same year. In 2017, she was awarded a Guggenheim Fellowship in Law.

Kitrosser has appeared as a media expert on constitutional law and free speech in several news outlets, particularly during the second presidency of Donald Trump. In 2025, she voiced opposition to her employer's settlement with Trump, warning that "allow[ing] its institutional judgment in terms of academic freedom, in terms of student speech, in terms of admissions criteria... to be overriden [sic] by the demands of the federal government" contrary to the First Amendment to the United States Constitution.

== Works ==
- Reclaiming Accountability: Transparency, Executive Power, and the U.S. Constitution (2015)
