= Susan D. Jones =

American professor of veterinary history

Susan Dorothy Jones (born 1964) is an American professor of veterinary history at the University of Minnesota, Twin Cities where she is the Distinguished McKnight University Professor in the Program in History of Science, Technology and Medicine at the College of Biological Sciences, and the College of Science and Engineering. Her research interests cover the history of biomedical and life sciences, historical ecology of disease, and role of science in mediating human-animal interactions over time.

== Education ==
Jones trained as a veterinarian and a historian of science, with specialization in the historical ecology of disease, comparative and veterinary medicine, and environment and health. She received her Bachelor of Arts degree from the Harvard Radcliffe Institute, after which she obtained her Doctor of Veterinary Medicine degree from the College of Veterinary Medicine at the University of Illinois Urbana-Champaign in 1990; and a PhD in History and Sociology of Science at the University of Pennsylvania in 1997 under Charles E. Rosenberg. Jones has received the Guggenheim Fellowship for her research projects, and has won awards from the Fulbright Program and the National Science Foundation. She has offered lectures and summer courses at the University of Vienna, Tsinghua University, Beijing, the University of Cambridge, and the Center for the History of Microbiology/ASM Archives (CHOMA).

Prior to joining University of Minnesota in 2005, Jones taught at the Department of History at the University of Colorado Boulder, and was a Visiting Scholar at Cambridge University. She was a former co-president of the World Association for the History of Veterinary Medicine.

== Selected publications ==
- Jones, Susan D.; Koolmees, Peter A. (2022). A Concise History of Veterinary Medicine. Cambridge University Press. doi:10.1017/9781108354929. ISBN 978-1-108-35492-9.
- Jones, Susan D. (2016). "Population Cycles, Disease, and Networks of Ecological Knowledge". Journal of the History of Biology. 50 (2): 357–391. doi:10.1007/s10739-016-9441-z. ISSN 0022-5010. PMID 27098776.
- Jones, Susan D. (2014). "Veterinary Medicine". In Slotten, Hugh Richard (ed.). The Oxford Encyclopedia of the History of American Science, Medicine, and Technology. Oxford University Press. doi:10.1093/acref/9780199766666.001.0001. ISBN 978-0-19-976666-6.
- Jones, Susan D. (2010). Death in a Small Package: A Short History of Anthrax. Johns Hopkins University Press+ORM. ISBN 978-1-4214-0252-9.
- Jones, Susan D.; Teigen, Philip M. (2008). "Anthrax in Transit: Practical Experience and Intellectual Exchange". Isis. 99 (3): 455–485. doi:10.1086/591709. PMID 18959192.
- Jones, Susan D. (2005). "Body and Place: Future Directions for the Field of Environmental History". Environmental History. 10 (1): 47–49. ISSN 1084-5453. JSTOR 3985839.
- Jones, Susan D. (2004). "Mapping a Zoonotic Disease: Anglo-American Efforts to Control Bovine Tuberculosis before World War I". Osiris. 19: 133–148. doi:10.1086/649398. ISSN 0369-7827. PMID 15478271.
- Jones, Susan D. (2003). Valuing Animals: Veterinarians and Their Patients in Modern America. Johns Hopkins University Press. ISBN 978-0-8018-7129-0.
- Jones, Susan (1999). "Becoming a Pest: Prairie Dog Ecology and the Human Economy in the Euroamerican West". Environmental History. 4 (4): 531–552. Bibcode:1999EnvH....4..531J. doi:10.2307/3985400. ISSN 1084-5453. JSTOR 3985400.
- Jones, Susan D. (1997). "Framing Animal Disease: Housecats with Feline Urological Syndrome, Their Owners, and Their Doctors". Journal of the History of Medicine and Allied Sciences. 52 (2): 202–235. doi:10.1093/jhmas/52.2.202. ISSN 0022-5045. PMID 9197115.
