= Robert G. Morrison =

American scholar of Islam (born 1969)

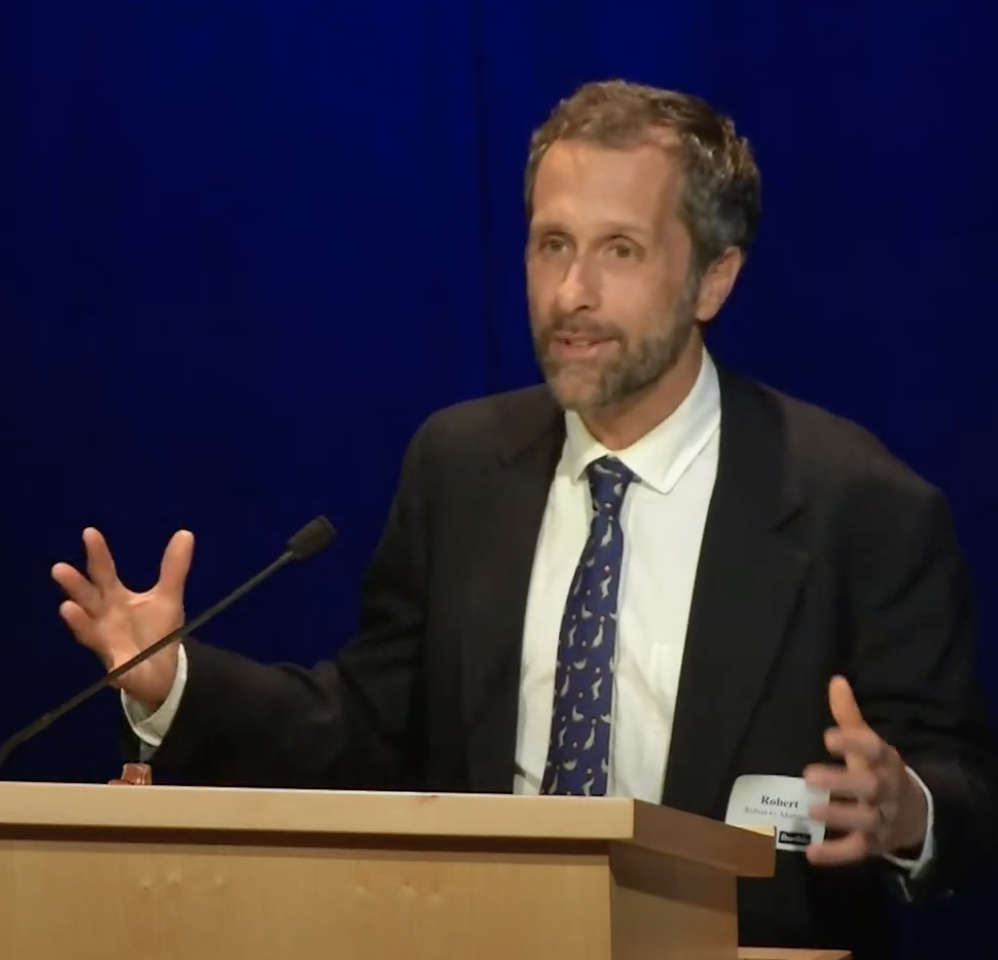
- Born: July 9, 1969 (age 57)
- Education: Harvard University (B.A.); Columbia University (Ph.D.)
- Awards: Guggenheim Fellowship 2018 National Humanities Center Fellowship 2018-2019
- Scientific career
- Fields: History of science and technology, history of astronomy
- Workplaces: Bowdoin College (2008-)
- Thesis: The intellectual development of Niẓām al-Dīn al-Nīsābūrī, d. 1329 A.D. (1998)
- Website: www.bowdoin.edu/profiles/faculty/rgmorris/

Robert Morrison (born 1969) is a historian of science and American scholar of Islam. He is the George Lincoln Skolfield Jr. Professor of Religion and Middle Eastern and North Studies, Chair of the Religion Department, Director of the Middle Eastern and North African Studies Program at Bowdoin College, Brunswick, Maine, U.S. where he has been since 2008. Morrison is the current president of The Commission on History of Science and Technology in Islamic Societies.

== Biography ==
Morrison received a bachelor's degree in the History of Science from Harvard University, Massachusetts. He then completed his doctorate at Columbia University New York, where he studied science (astronomy) in Islamic societies under the supervision of George Saliba. He was awarded the World Prize for the Book of the Year of the Islamic Republic of Iran in Islamic Studies in 2009, for his book Islam and Science: The Intellectual Career of Nizam al-Din Al-Nisaburi (2007). In 2018, Morrison was awarded the Guggenheim Fellowship for research on the Jewish scholarly intermediaries between the Ottoman Empire and Renaissance Italy. In 2019, Morrison was a Distinguished Visitor at UC Berkeley.

His recent book, The Light of the World: Astronomy in al-Andalus studied scientific theories which were produced in Andalusia in 1400, and traveled first to the Ottoman court and then to the University of Padua, Italy. His research has also been supported by the National Endowment for the Humanities and by fellowships at the Stanford Humanities Center and the National Humanities Center.

== Research ==
Morrison's doctoral research uncovered the scientific contributions of Nisaburi. Nisaburi was a scholar of religious sciences and astronomy and was influenced by influential scholars Nasir al-Din al-Tusi and Qutb al-Din al-Shirazi. His doctoral research addressed the historical interactions between Islam and science.

The main thrust of Morrison's research has been the connection between the scientific culture of the Ottoman Empire and the science of the Renaissance. His work elucidates the connections between Islamic astronomy and Copernican astronomy. In a 2018 interview, he stated "what I’m doing is finding organic connections between the two worlds."

Morrison's research has discovered a network of Jewish scholars who traveled between the Turkish Ottoman Empire and the Vèneto in northeastern Italy. A key figure in his research is a Jewish scholar named Moses Galeano. Galeano brought Islamic astronomy to Venice and Padua. His 2025 book Merchants of Knowledge: Intellectual Exchange in the Ottoman Empire and Renaissance Europe addresses the question of intellectual exchange between Islamic societies and the West in the 1400s and early 1500s, and examines how scientific knowledge and information circulated in the Mediterranean.

== Personal life ==
Morrison currently resides with his family in Maine, U.S.

== Bibliography ==
=== Books ===
- Merchants of Knowledge: Intellectual Exchange in the Ottoman Empire and Renaissance Europe, Stanford University Press, April 2025. ISBN 9781503636323 (hardcover)
- Astronomy in Al-Andalus: Joseph Ibn Naḥmias’ The Light of the World. University of California Press, 2016.
- Texts in Transit in the Medieval Mediterranean, Penn State University Press, 2016.
- Nizam-al-Nisaburi: The Intellectual Career of Niẓām al-Dīn al-Nīsābūrī. Oxon, UK: Routledge, 2007.

=== Selected articles ===
- "Cosmography, Cosmology, and Kalām from Samarqand to Istanbul," Intellectual History of the Islamicate World (2020): 1-30.
- Tables for Computing Lunar Crescent Visibility in Adderet Eliyahu Sources and Commentaries in the Exact Sciences, vol. 20 (2019): 157–201.
- Cosmology and Cosmic Order in Islamic Astronomy Early Science and Medicine 24, no. 4 (2019): 340–366.
- Moses Galeano’ Treatise on the Natures of Medicines and Their Use Nazariyat: Journal for the History of Islamic Philosophy and Sciences (2016).
- "Religion and Science in the Eastern Mediterranean" Isis 107, no. 3 (2016): 579–582.
- “A Scholarly Intermediary Between the Ottoman Empire and Renaissance Europe,” Isis (3/2014): 32–57.
- “What Was the Purpose of Astronomy in Ījī’s Kitāb al-Mawāqif fī ‘ilm al-kalām?” in Judith Pfeiffer (ed.): Tabriz after the Mongol Conquest (Brill, 2013): pp. 201–229.
- “Natural Theology and the Qur’ān,” Journal of Qur’ānic Studies XV (2013): pp. 1–22.
- “An Astronomical Treatise by Mūsā Jālīnūs alias Moses Galeano,” Aleph: Historical Studies in Science and Judaism X/2 (2011): 315–353.
- “Islamic Astronomy and Cosmology,” in David Lindberg and Michael Shank (eds.): Cambridge History of Science, vol. 5 (Cambridge University Press, 2011): 109–138.
- "Islamic Astronomy" in Robert Irwin (ed.) New Cambridge History of Islam (Cambridge University Press, 2010), vol. 4: pp. 589–613.
- "Discussions of Astrology in Early Tafsīr" Journal of Qur’ānic Studies XI (2009): 49–71.
- “Science and Theodicy in Q 2:6/7,” in Jitse M. van der Meer and Scott Mandelbrote (eds.): Nature and Scripture in the Abrahamic Religions (Leiden: E.J. Brill, 2008).
- "The Role of Portrayals of Nature in Medieval Qur'an Commentaries” Arabica LII (2005): 182–203.
- “The Solar Model of Joseph Ibn Nahmias” Arabic Sciences and Philosophy XV (2005): 75–108.
- "Quṭb al-Dīn al-Shīrāzī’s Hypotheses for Celestial Motions." Journal for the History of Arabic Science 13 (2005): 21–140.
- "The Response of Ottoman Religious Scholars to European Science" Archivum Ottomanicum XXI (2003): 187–195.
- "The Portrayal of Nature in a Medieval Qur’an Commentary" Studia Islamica XCIV (2002): 115–138.
- "Conceptions of the Soul in Abraham Ibn Ezra's Poetry" Edebiyat XI (2000): 239–259.
