= Ian van Coller =

South African photographer

- Born: 1970 (age 55–56)
- Known for: Photography and Visual Art
- Awards: Guggenheim Fellowship
- Website: www.ianvancoller.com

Ian van Coller (born 1970) is South African American visual artist and academic. He has been a professor of photography at Montana State University since 2006.

Van Coller also is a recipient of a 2018 Guggenheim Fellowship. His first monograph, Interior Relations, was published in 2011 by Charles Lane Press in New York.

His current artistic focus is on environmental matters, specifically climate change and deep time.

== Exhibitions (selection) ==
=== Solo ===
- 2022: Naturalists of the Long Now, Blue Sky Gallery, Portland, Oregon
- 2022: Ian Van Coller: The Last Glacier, Passages Bookshop, Portland, Oregon
- 2022: Svalbard, JDC Fine Art, Gleneden Beach, Oregon
- 2021: Naturalists of the Long Now, Brigham Young University-Idaho, Rexburg
- 2020: Ancient Lands, Recent Expeditions, JDC Fine Art, Gleneden Beach, Oregon
- 2018: The Last Glacier, Arts Center Gallery, Peck School of the Arts, University of Wisconsin-Milwaukee
- 2017: Kilimanjaro: The Last Glacier, Schneider Gallery, Chicago, Illinois
- 2015: The Last Glacier, SFO Museum, San Francisco, California
- 2011: Makarapa and Vuvuzela, Art Association of Jackson Hole, Jackson Hole, Wyoming
- 2001: Mining Africa, Lisa Sette Gallery, Scottsdale, Arizona
- 2001: Acclimatization Chamber, The Print Center, Philadelphia

=== Group ===
- 2024: Poetics of Dissonance, Scottsdale Museum of Contemporary Art, Scottsdale, Arizona
- 2023: Fifth National Climate Assessment Exhibition, online exhibition
- 2022: The National: Best Contemporary Photography 2022, Fort Wayne Art Museum, Indiana
- 2021: Future Past, 2019 Critical Mass Top 50, Center for Photographic Art, Carmel, California
- 2020: Anthropocene, Tbilisi History Museum, Tbilisi, Georgia
- 2019: Terra Nostra-The Age of the Anthropocene, Photaumnales, Hauts-de-France, France
- 2018: Our Anthropocene: Eco Crises, curated by Gary van Wyk, Center for Book Arts, New York
- 2017: Collections in Conversation: Photobooks at the Arts and Beineke Libraries, Yale University

== Bibliography (selection) ==
- Ian van Coller’s Haptic Sublime, Ben Read, Osmos Magazine, 2024
- The Transparency of Time, Airborne Wind Energy Conference, 2024
- The Victorian Ecologist, by Kristen French, Nautilus Magazine, 50th Anniversary Issue, 2023
- The Last Glacier: Making art in a changing landscape, Cory Walsh, The Missoulian, Montana, 2022
- Fast Time, MIT Technology Review Magazine, 2021
- Images of the West: The Last Glacier. Essay by Nancy M. Mahoney, Big Sky Journal, Bozeman Montana, 2020
- Our Anthropocene: Eco Crises, curated by Gary van Wyk, Center for Book Arts, New York City, 2018
