= Nandini Sikand =

Indian filmmaker and dancer

- Born: New Delhi, India
- Education: St. Stephen's College, Delhi (BA); Northern Illinois University (MA); CUNY Graduate Center (PhD)
- Occupations: Filmmaker; anthropologist; Odissi dancer
- Employer: Lafayette College
- Known for: Languid Bodies, Grounded Stances; Soma Girls; Inside/Outside
- Awards: Guggenheim Fellowship (2018)
- Website: sites.lafayette.edu/sikandn/

Nandini Sikand is an Indian-American filmmaker, anthropologist, and classical Odissi dancer. She is a Professor of Film and Media Studies at Lafayette College in Easton, Pennsylvania. Sikand is known for her work in documentary cinema focusing on issues of women's rights, the prison industrial complex, and diasporic identity, as well as her academic writing on Indian dance traditions. She was a 2018 Guggenheim Fellow in Film and Video.

== Biography ==
Sikand was born and raised in New Delhi, India. She began training in the Indian classical dance form Odissi at the age of seven. She attended St. Stephen's College, Delhi, where she earned a Bachelor of Arts in Philosophy. She later moved to the United States, earning a Master of Arts in Communications from Northern Illinois University and a Doctor of Philosophy in Anthropology from the CUNY Graduate Center. Her doctoral dissertation Dissertation: Dancing With Tradition: A Global Community of Odissi Dancers was supervised by Michael Blim.

Sikand's work as a filmmaker spans over two decades, primarily in documentary and experimental formats. In an article from The Massachusetts Review about the sociopolitical landscape surrounding South Asian American culture, Ketu H. Katrak noted that Sikand's video The Bhangra Wrap illustrates that bhangra extends beyond its nature as a performance art by acting as a "struggle over the definition of authenticity, tradition, cultural values, and above all, sexual mores". One of her short films, Amazonia (2001), was a video poem which centered on breast cancer and juxtaposes electronic sounds with images of medical scenes, city views, and others; Sally Walters called Sikand's vision for the film "one of defiance and non-capitulation".

Some of Sikand's films are longer than twenty minutes, including Don’t Fence Me In (1998), a feature documentary centered on her mother Krishna Sikand, and Soma Girls (2009), centered on the lives of girls born to sex workers and raised in a Kolkata hostel. In 2018, she was awarded a Guggenheim Fellowship in Film and Video. Her 2019 feature documentary, Inside/Outside, focuses on incarcerated women reentering society in the Lehigh Valley. She was part of the board of directors for feminist media non-profit Women Make Movies from 1997 until 2006.

Sikand is the co-founder and co-director of Sakshi Productions, a neo-classical and contemporary dance company. She has performed at major venues including Lincoln Center for the Performing Arts, the Joyce SoHo, and the Brooklyn Museum. Her choreographic work often combines film imagery with live performance. In 2013, she served as the choreographer for an opera based on the life of Phoolan Devi, blending Odissi vocabulary with operatic storytelling. She and Rahul Acharya danced the Arabhi Pallavi at the 2009 Erasing Borders Dance Festival in Manhattan; Alastair Macaulay of The New York Times praised the performances' posture and eye language.

Sikand is a Professor of Film and Media Studies at Lafayette College. Her academic fields include race, gender, documentary, and the prison industrial complex. She is the author of Languid Bodies, Grounded Stances: The Curving Pathway of Neoclassical Odissi Dance (2016), published by Berghahn Books. The book combines ethnographic research with dance history to analyze the evolution of Odissi.

Sikand has received grants from the Center for Asian American Media, The Jerome Foundation, and the New York State Council on the Arts.

== Selected works ==
=== Filmography ===
- The Bhangra Wrap (1995)
- Don't Fence Me In (1998)
- Amazonia (2001)
- Mahasweta Devi (2001)
- In Whose Name? (2004)
- Soma Girls (2009)
- Cranes of Hope (2011)
- Slightest Shifts (2012)
- One, if by Land (2015)
- Inside/Outside (2019)

=== Books ===
- Languid Bodies, Grounded Stances: The Curving Pathway of Neoclassical Odissi Dance. Berghahn Books. 2016. ISBN 978-1-78533-368-2.
