= Stefania Tutino =

Italian historian (born 1977)

- Born: 11 April 1977 (age 49)
- Occupation: Historian
- Awards: Helen & Howard R. Marraro Prize in Italian History (2011)

Academic background
- Education: University of Pisa (laurea); Scuola Normale Superiore (fellow diploma and PhD)

Academic work
- Sub-discipline: Post-Reformation Catholic history
- Institutions: University of California, Santa Barbara; University of California, Los Angeles

Stefania Tutino (born 11 April 1977) is an Italian historian. A 2018 Guggenheim Fellow, she has written several books on Catholic history and won the 2011 Helen & Howard R. Marraro Prize in Italian History. She has worked as a professor at the University of California, Santa Barbara and University of California, Los Angeles.

== Biography ==
Tutino was born on 11 April 1977. She obtained her laurea in modern history (2000) at the University of Pisa and her fellow diploma (2000) and PhD in history (2003) at the Scuola Normale Superiore.

After serving as a Andrew W. Mellon Postdoctoral Fellow at the University of California, Los Angeles (2003-2005), Tutino moved to the University of California, Santa Barbara to become a visiting assistant professor. She joined the faculty as an assistant professor in 2006, before being promoted to associate professor in 2008 and full professor in 2010. By 2014, she had returned to UCLA as a professor.

Tutino's academic interests include the history of Catholicism after the Reformation. After authoring Law and Conscience (2007) (Note: Reviews of this book:) and Thomas White and the Blackloists (2008), (Note: Reviews of this book:) she won the 2011 American Catholic Historical Association Helen & Howard R. Marraro Prize in Italian History for her book Empire of Souls (2010). She won a 2014-2015 Andrew W. Mellon Foundation Post-Doctoral Rome Prize. She was later author of Shadows of Doubt (2014) (Note: Reviews of this book:) and Uncertainty in Post-Reformation Catholicism (2018). In 2018, she was awarded a Guggenheim Fellow in Intellectual & Cultural History. She is also a National Endowment for the Humanities Fellow.

Tutino is an Italian and American citizen.

== Works ==
- Law and Conscience: Catholicism in Early Modern England, 1570-1625 (2007)
- Thomas White and the Blackloists: Between Politics and Theology during the English Civil War (2008)
- Empire of Souls: Robert Bellarmine and the Christian Commonwealth (2010) (Note: Reviews of this book:)
- Shadows of Doubt: Language and Truth in Post-Reformation Catholic Culture (2014)
- Uncertainty in Post-Reformation Catholicism: A History of Probabilism (2018)
