= Robert Finch (nature writer) =

American nature writer and radio commentator

Robert Finch (June 16, 1943 – September 30, 2024) was an American author, essayist, and radio commentator.

== Biography ==
He was born in New Jersey and grew up in West Virginia. He moved to Cape Cod in 1971 and wrote several books about the nature, natural and human histories of Cape Cod. His first book, Common Ground: A Naturalist's Cape Cod (1981), was nominated for the Pulitzer Prize for non-fiction in 1982.

Robert Finch served as publications director for the Cape Cod Museum of Natural History and as a staff member of the Bread Loaf Writers' Conference at Middlebury College. His radio show with the National Public Radio member station WGBH, titled "A Cape Cod Notebook", won the 2006 "New England Edward R. Murrow Award for Best Radio Writing." For ten years, Finch also taught creative nonfiction in the Spalding University Master of Fine Arts program.

== Awards ==
- Nomination for Pulitzer Prize (Common Ground, 1981)
- Fellowship, Bread Loaf Writers' Conference, 1982
- New England Literary Lights Award, Associates of the Boston Public Library, 1999
- New England Booksellers Association Non-Fiction Award for 2001
- Notable Essays, The Best American Essays, 2000, ed. Alan Lightman
- Notable Essays, The Best American Essays 2006, ed. Lauren Slater
- 2005 Edward R. Murrow Award for Radio Writing
- 2013 Edward R. Murrow Award for Radio Writing

== Praise for Robert Finch ==
Annie Dillard said: "Robert Finch is one of our finest observers...I admire his essays very much for their strength, subtlety, and above all their geniality."

== Bibliography ==
=== Collections of Essays ===
- Common Ground: A Naturalist's Cape Cod, W. W. Norton, 1981. ISBN 9780393311792.
- The Primal Place, W. W. Norton, 1983. ISBN 9780393016239.
- Outlands: Journey to the Outer Edges of Cape Cod (1986) (ISBN 0879237422)
- Advisory Editor, On Nature (Daniel Halpern, Ed.), North Point Press, 1987.
- The Norton Book of Nature Writing (Co-Editor), W. W. Norton (1990, Second Edition, 2002) (co-edited with John Elder) (ISBN 0393027996)
- The Cape Itself (with photographs by Ralph Mackenzie), W. W. Norton, 1991. ISBN 9780393029949.
- A Place Apart: A Cape Cod Reader (Editor), W. W. Norton, 1993. ISBN 9780393034806.
- Cape Cod: Its Natural and Cultural History, National Park Service. 1994.
- The Smithsonian Guide to Natural America: Southern New England: Massachusetts, Connecticut, Rhode Island (co-authored with Jonathan Wallen), 1996. (ISBN 0679764755)
- Death of a Hornet: and Other Cape Cod Essays, 2001. ISBN 1582431388.
- Special Places on Cape Cod and The Islands, Commonwealth Editions, 2003. (ISBN 1889833517)
- The Iambics of Newfoundland: Notes from an Unknown Shore, 2007. ISBN 1582434212.
- A Cape Cod Notebook, 2011. ISBN 9780978576691.
- A Cape Cod Notebook 2, Clock & Rose Press, 2016.
- The Outer Beach: A Thousand-Mile Walk on Cape Cod’s Atlantic Shore, W. W. Norton, 2017. ISBN 978-0-393-08130-5.
