= Alison Griffiths (professor) =

American professor of film and media studies

- Born: Wales

Academic background
- Education: New York University

Academic work
- Discipline: Cinema Studies
- Institutions: Baruch College; CUNY Graduate Center
- Website: https://alisongriffiths.org/

Alison Griffiths is an American professor at the Department of Communication Studies at Baruch College of the The City University of New York, and the CUNY Graduate Center, where she teaches film history, visual studies, and media theory. Her writing covers such topics as the history of ethnographic film, medieval visual studies, and new media. She was named the CUNY Distinguished Professor of Film and Media Studies in 2019.

== Career ==
Griffiths received her Bachelors in Drama and English from the University of Leicester in 1986, her Masters in Film and Media from the University of London in 1990, and her PhD in Cinema Studies from New York University in 1998. She now teaches at Baruch College.

Griffiths has published three academic books. Her first, Wondrous Difference: Cinema, Anthropology, and Turn-of-the-Century Visual Culture, is about the role of anthropological film at the turn of the century. Her second book, Shivers Down Your Spine: Cinema, Museums, and the Immersive View, describes how media throughout the centuries, from medieval cathedrals to IMAX films, have created an immersive experience, and her most recent work, Carceral Fantasies: Cinema and Prison in Early Twentieth-Century America, covers the relationship between prisons and their depiction in early cinema.

Griffiths was a 2022 Fulbright Distinguished Arctic Scholar in Norway and a 2018 Guggenheim Fellow.
