= Vincent Beduer =

French footballer (born 1987)

Personal information
- Date of birth: 17 March 1987 (age 39)
- Place of birth: Figeac, France
- Height: 1.71 m (5 ft 7 in)
- Position: Defender

Youth career
- –2002: Quercy Foot
- 2002–?: Montpellier

Senior career*
Years	Team	Apps	(Gls)
2004–2007	Montpellier (B team)		
2004–2005	Montpellier	1	(0)
2007–2009	Moulins		
2009–2010	Aviron Bayonnais	8	(0)
2010–2011	Blagnac FC	16	(0)
2015–2016	US Castanet	7	(0)
- * Club domestic league appearances and goals

Vincent Beduer (born 17 March 1987) is a French former professional footballer who played as a defender.

== Career ==
Beduer was born in Figeac. He moved to Montpellier's youth academy from Quercy Foot in 2002, playing as a striker at the time. In his first season at the club he missed half the season due to a serious injury. He scored four goals and provided six assists for the club's U15 team playing as a left midfielder.

He made one appearance in Ligue 2 for Montpellier.
