= Figeac =

- Subprefecture and commune
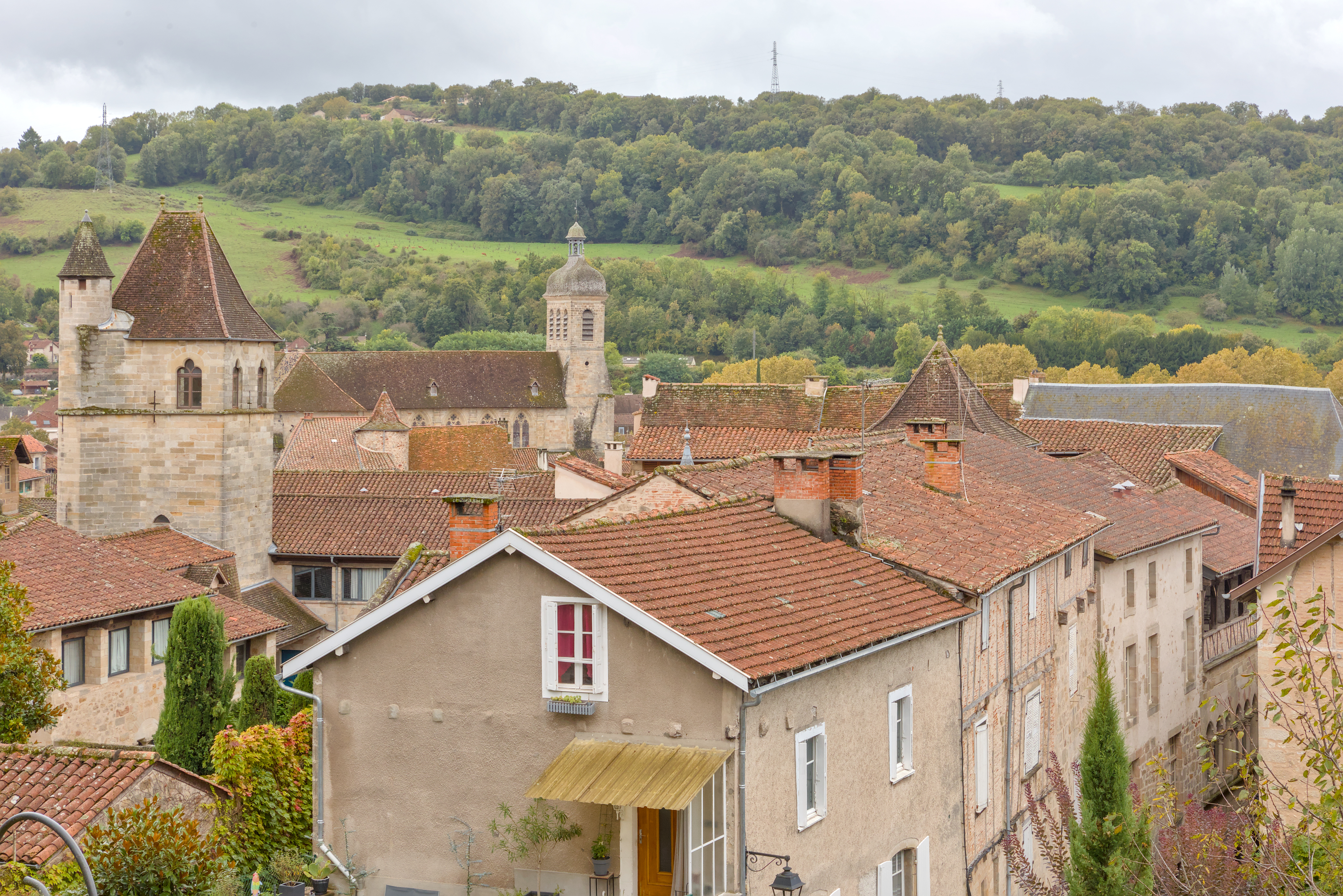
- A view of Figeac from the parvise of Notre-Dame-du-Puy church.

- Coat of arms
- Location of Figeac
- Location within France Location within Occitanie
- Coordinates: 44°36′31″N 2°01′54″E
- Country: France
- Region: Occitania
- Department: Lot
- Arrondissement: Figeac
- Canton: Figeac-1 and 2
- Intercommunality: Grand-Figeac

Government
  - Mayor (2020–2026): André Mellinger
- Area^{1}: 35.16 km^{2} (13.58 sq mi)
- Elevation: 225 m (738 ft)
- Highest elevation: 451 m (1,480 ft)
- Lowest elevation: 170 m (560 ft)
- Population (2023): 9,793
  - Density: 278.5/km^{2} (721.4/sq mi)
- Time zone: UTC+01:00 (CET)
  - Summer (DST): UTC+02:00 (CEST)
- INSEE/Postal code: 46102 /46100
- ^{1} French Land Register data, which excludes lakes, ponds, glaciers > 1 km^{2} (0.386 sq mi or 247 acres) and river estuaries.

Figeac (French pronunciation: [fiʒak]; Occitan: Fijac) is a commune in the southwestern French department of Lot. Figeac is a sub-prefecture of the department.

== Geography ==
Figeac is on the via Podiensis, a major medieval pilgrimage trail that is part of the Camino de Santiago network. Today, as a part of France's system of long-distance footpaths, it is known as the GR 65. Figeac station is a railway junction with connections to Brive-la-Gaillarde, Toulouse, Aurillac and Rodez.

== Population ==
Historical population
Year	Pop.	±% p.a.
1968	9,593	—
1975	10,077	+0.71%
1982	9,667	−0.59%
1990	9,549	−0.15%
1999	9,606	+0.07%
2007	9,994	+0.50%
2012	9,783	−0.43%
2017	9,792	+0.02%
2023	9,793	+0.00%
Source: INSEE

== Local culture and heritage ==
=== Places and monuments ===
Figeac is classified as a city of art and history and has been recognized by the Midi-Pyrénées Regional Council as one of the eighteen Great Sites of Occitania. The old town has kept its layout and winding streets of the Middle Ages with many old sandstone houses.

==== Religious heritage ====
- Chapel Notre-Dame-de-Pitié de Figeac - a 13th-century building, integrated into the Église Saint-Sauveur, was classified as a historical monument in 1840.
- Chapelle de l'hôpital de Figeac.
- Église Saint-Dau de Ceint-d'Eau.

===== L’église Saint-Sauveur =====
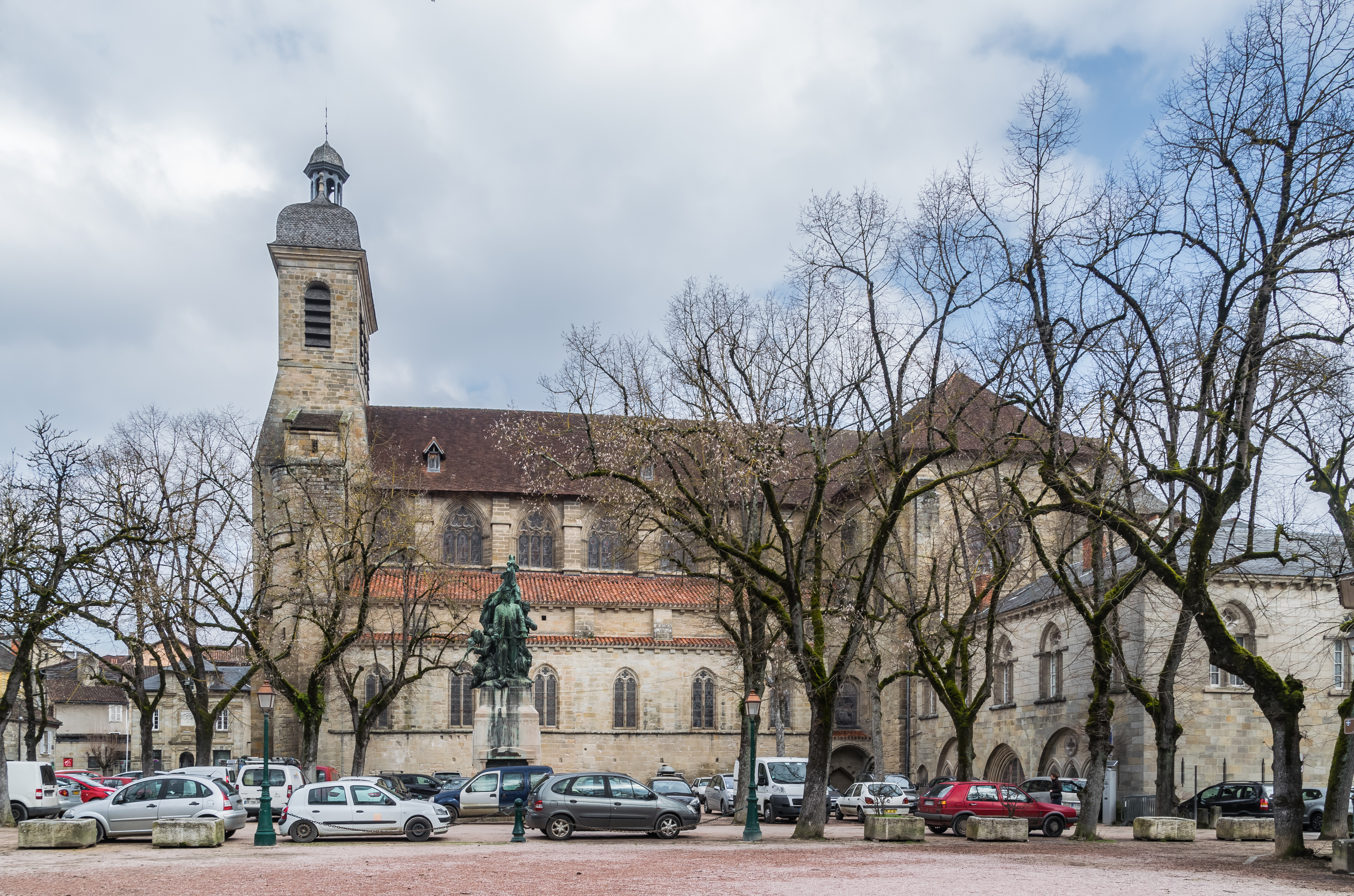
Saint-Sauveur Church.

The building was classified as a historical monument in 1840. Several religious objects are referenced in the Base Palissy database. This church, the only remains of a Cluny abbey, was consecrated in 1092. Saint Hugh was its abbot. Although modified over the centuries, either because of embellishments or because of the damage caused by the Hundred Years' War or the French Wars of Religion, it nevertheless has survived.

It was a pilgrimage church, similar in size to Saint-Sernin de Toulouse or Abbey Church of Sainte-Foy, with a triple nave, a vast transept, an ambulatory and an apse with radiating chapels. The old chapter house is decorated with polychrome wood of the 17th century.

A capital from this church, the top part of a column, was re-cut into a font and is exhibited in New York at The Cloisters (Metropolitan Museum of Art).

===== L'église des Carmes =====
The building was listed as a historical monument in 1993. Twelve paintings of the apostles are referenced in the Base Palissy database. Formerly Church of Saint-Thomas-Becket, it is the most modest church in size in the city. Located near the hospital, at the entrance of Figeac, it is the last witness of the former Carmelites convent that was once established there.

===== L’église Notre-Dame-du-Puy =====
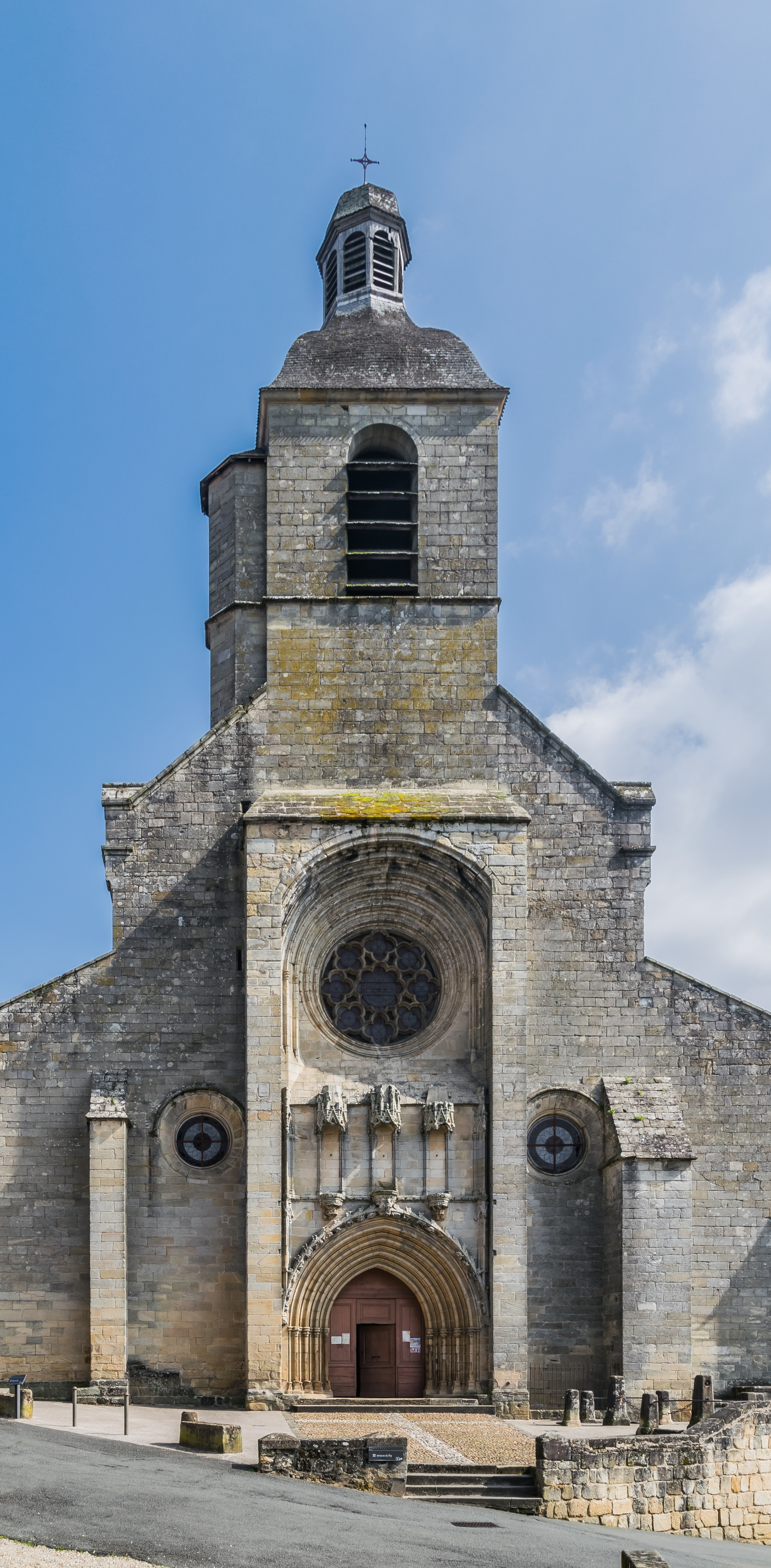
Notre-Dame du Puy church.

The building was classified as a historical monument in 1916. Several religious objects are referenced in the Base Palissy database. The aptly named, since it dominates all Figeac, on the Place du Foirail. This church of Romanesque origin was remodelled several times, especially in the 14th and 17th centuries, when the three central bays were united into one; The choir contains beautiful carved Romanesque capitals and a large carved walnut altarpiece, dated 1696. Yet it is the oldest parish of Figeac, born, according to tradition, from a miracle: The Virgin would have made a hawthorn bloom there in winter. It was the seat of a brotherhood of St. James.

===== Musée Champollion =====
The city is home to the Champollion Museum les écritures du monde (the writings of the world). There are more than 40,000 visitors a year. Visitors can discover through the collections how writing has appeared in the world for 5,000 years.

The Champollion Museum is a major museum of the city, but there are other museums in Figeac: the Musée Paulin-Ratier, the musée de la Résistance and finally the Musée d'histoire de Figeac. The latter was redesigned in 2012 in the spirit of cabinets of curiosities, in rooms belonging to the former seminary, behind the Notre-Dame-du-Puy church.

===== La place des Écritures =====
Embedded in a medieval architectural ensemble, its floor is covered with a monumental reproduction of the Rosetta Stone (14 × 7 m), carved in black granite from Zimbabwe by the American conceptual artist Joseph Kosuth. Inaugurated in April 1991, this important contemporary work can also be contemplated from the museum's hanging garden overlooking the square. In an adjoining courtyard, the French translation of the inscriptions is engraved on a glass plate.

===== L'obélisque de Champollion =====
On 11 March 1832, the municipal council decided to erect an obelisk in memory of Champollion. A subscription raised 4,000 francs and two years later a granite needle 7.8 meters high was extracted from the rock of Golinhac. It includes inscriptions in hieroglyphics meaning A Toujours! and two bronze plaques on the pedestal hosting Egyptian bas-reliefs.

===== Place Carnot =====
Formerly the Place de la Halle, it is surrounded by imposing houses, some made of cob, with wrought iron balconies, and under the roofs, open covered galleries, the soleilhos, which were once used to dry clothes or skins, or as a refuge to get some fresh air during a hot summer evening.

===== Les Aiguilles =====
The two "needles" around Figeac are large octagonal stone obelisks each resting on a pedestal of four steps. They are made of cemented dimension stone. The Aiguille du Cingle, standing south of the city, measures 14.50 meters. The L'aiguille de Lissac or Nayrac, standing to the west, measures 10.50 meters.

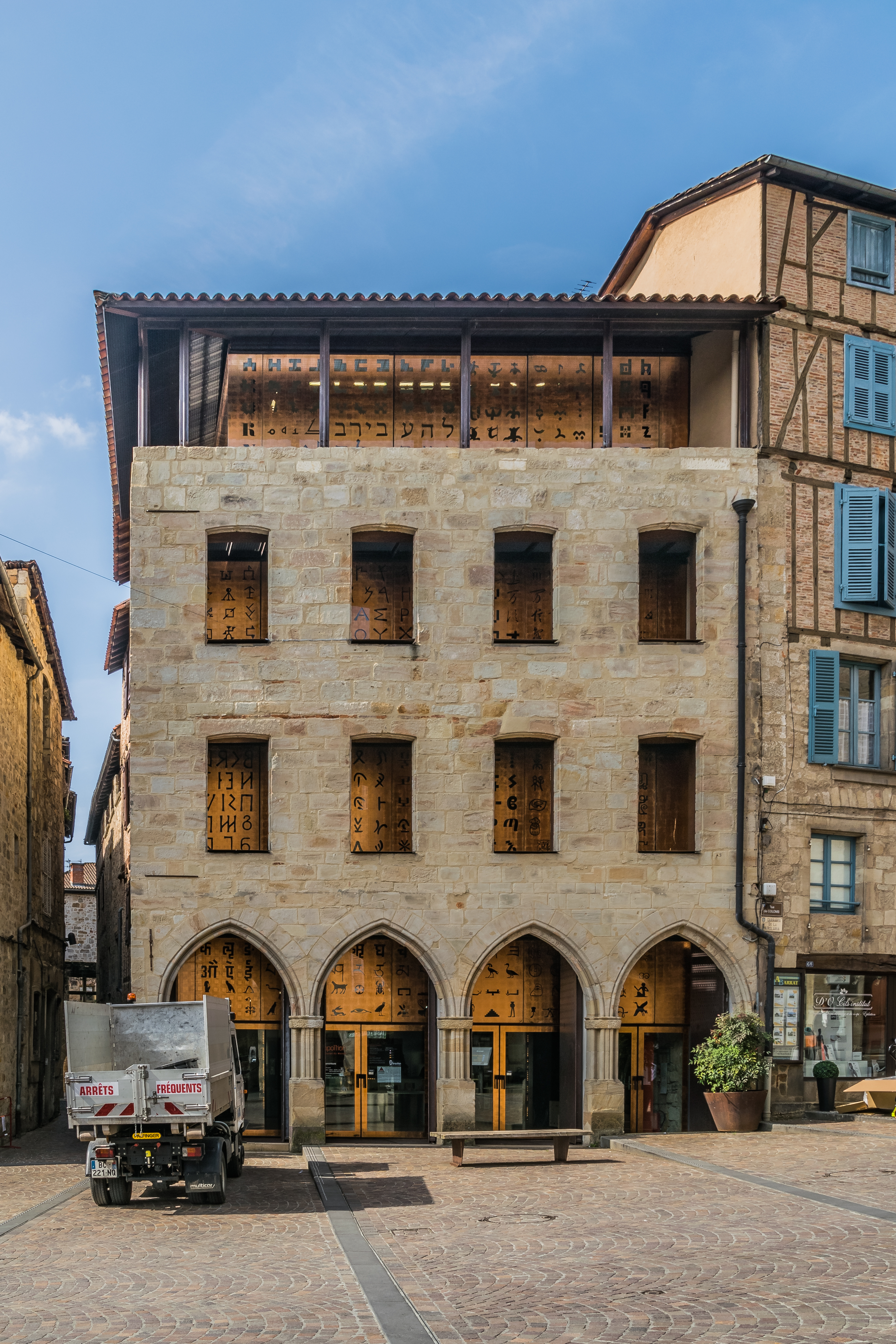
Champollion Museum

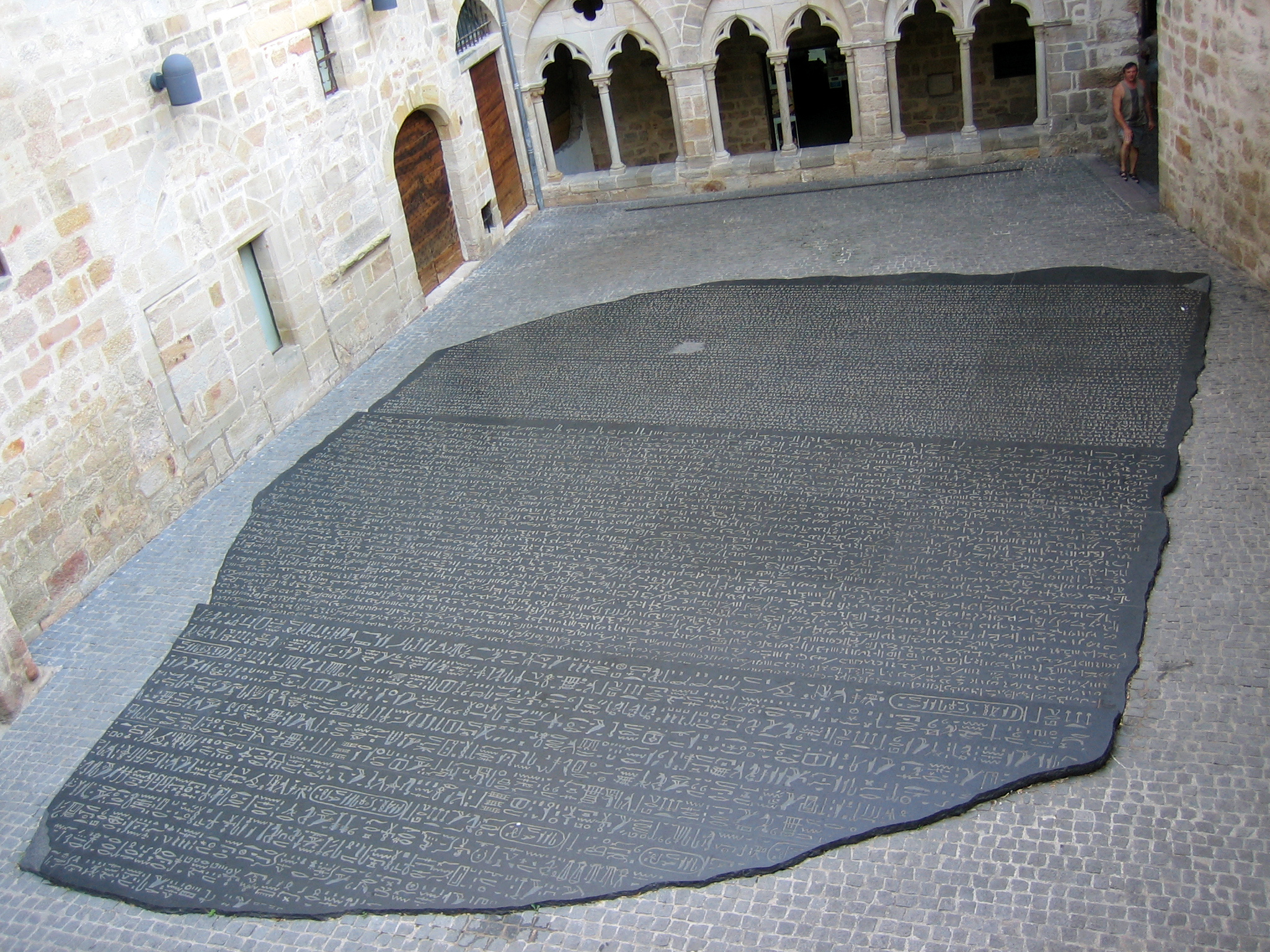
Place des ecritures

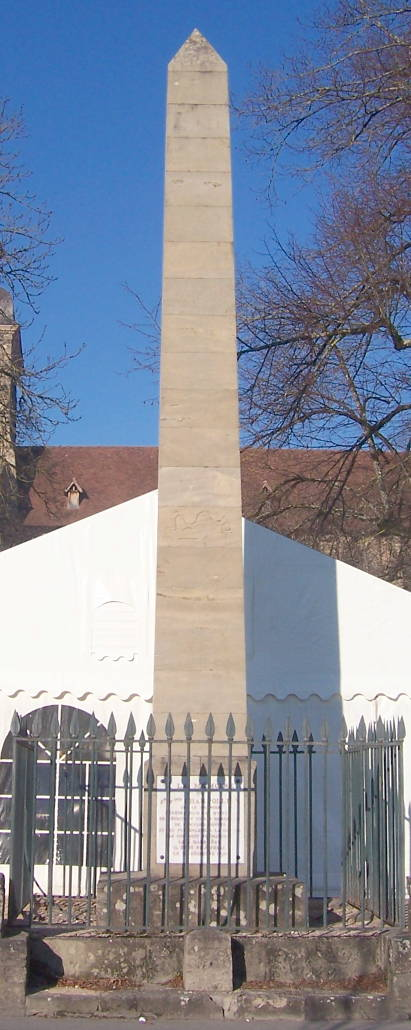
Obelisque Figeac

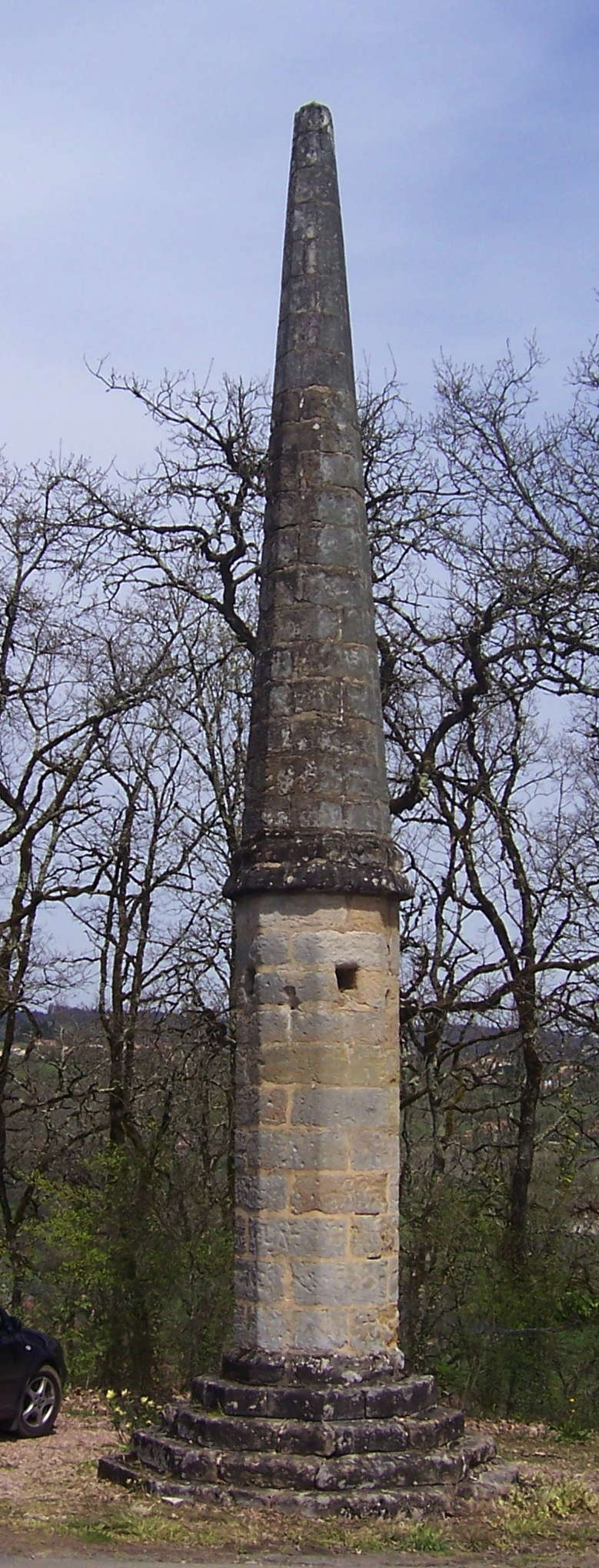
L'aiguille de Lissac

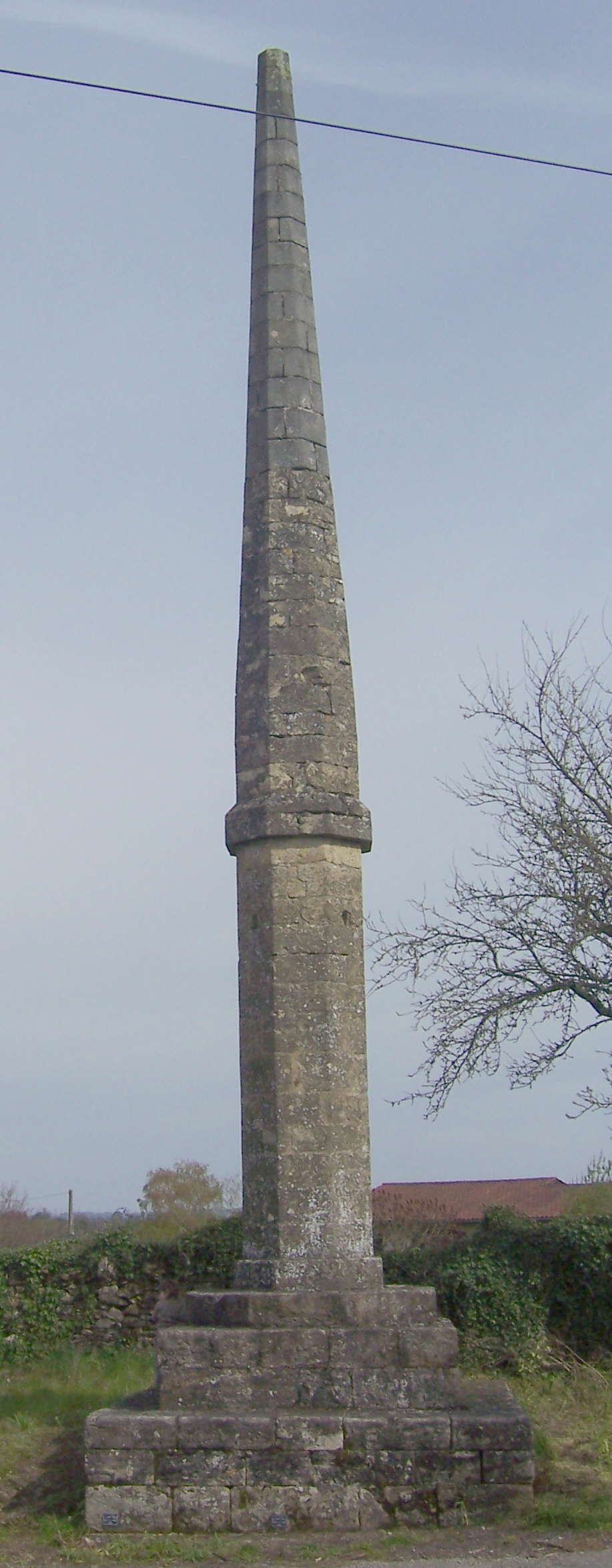
L'aiguille du Cingle

== Notable people ==
Jean-François Champollion, the first translator of Egyptian hieroglyphics, was born in Figeac, where there is a Champollion Museum. His father had married a woman from Figeac and opened a bookshop in the village. On the Place des écritures (writings square) is a giant copy of the Rosetta Stone, by Joseph Kosuth. French explorer and archeologist Théodore Ber was born in Figeac, although he spent most of his adult life in Peru. German film historian Lotte H. Eisner hid from the Nazis in Figeac during World War II.

The actor Charles Boyer and the football player Vincent Beduer were born in Figeac.

== Economy ==
This city hosts the headquarters of Figeac Aero.

== Media ==
Louis Malle's 1974 film, Lacombe Lucien, was filmed in Figeac.

== See also ==
- Communes of the Lot department
