= Théodore Ber =

French archaeologist and anthropologist (1820-1900)

Théodore Ber (7 March 1820 – 21 November 1900), was a French archaeologist and anthropologist who spent most of his adult life in Peru. Although an amateur, his work was appreciated by some scholars and officially recognized by the French government.

== Early life and move to Peru ==
Théodore Ber was born in Figeac in a family of tailors. He was sent to Bordeaux to learn the trade as an apprentice to his uncle, also a tailor. A talented young man, he was hired by an atelier in Paris, and later established his own company for exporting clothing to South America. Ber had no formal schooling but learned about world politics by reading socialist newspapers and books. After a stormy divorce, he moved to Chile in 1860 and Peru in 1863, where, notwithstanding his lack of education, he found employment as professor of French language and history.

He also maintained his socialist ideas, and when he learned about the revolutionary situation in France, he returned to his home country and joined the Commune of Paris, serving for a short period as personal secretary of Commune leader Louis Charles Delescluze. After the fall of the Commune, Ber escaped again to Peru in 1871, where he worked again as a teacher and founded a French language magazine, L’étoile du Sud. In the mid-1870s, he developed an interest in archaeology and anthropology and participated in the first excavations of the archaeological site of Ancon. He took notes of the excavations, and sent several boxes with artifacts and comments to French anthropologist Paul Broca, whose books he had read and appreciated. To Ber's great surprise, Broca reacted with enthusiasm, published his texts in his Revue d'anthropologie, and suggested to the French government to appoint Ber as head of a French archaeological mission to Peru. Ber got his official appointment on July 9, 1875. Thanks to Broca, Ber also became a member of the Society of Anthropology of Paris.

== Expedition to Tiwanaku ==
In Peru, Ber found himself in competition with French-Austrian explorer Charles Wiener, who had also obtained French official support for his activities. Wiener denounced Ber as a former member of the Commune, creating problems for him in France. While still formally working for the French government, Ber obtained financial support from American businessman Henry Meiggs for an archaeological expedition to Tiwanaku, Bolivia, in 1876–1877, against the promise of donating the artifacts he will find, on behalf of Meiggs, to Washington's Smithsonian Institution and the American Museum of Natural History in New York. The expedition to Tiwanaku was cut short by the violent hostility of the local population, instigated by the Catholic parish priest, but with the help of photographer Georg von Grumbkow, Ber was able to send to Paris a set of pictures documenting the status of the ruins of Tiwanaku in the 1870s.

His ill-fated expedition to Tiwanaku was criticized by the professional archaeological establishment, and he was largely dismissed as an amateur. His French friends, however, managed to have him re-appointed for short-term official missions to Peru in 1875 and 1890, and invited to international conferences. In his last years, he was a lonely figure. A lifelong member of Freemasonry, he had quarreled with his local lodge in Lima and no longer attended the meetings, and his political opinions had also antagonized other members of the French community in Peru.

== Death and legacy ==
Ber died in Lima in 1900. His name had been almost forgotten in France, although his articles in scholarly journals such as the Revue d'anthropologie, the Archives de la société Américaine de France and the Bulletin de la Société de Géographie de Paris have been rediscovered and appreciated in the late 20th century.

In 2014, the Champollion Museum in his native Figeac consecrated an exhibition to his explorations, 40 ans dans les andes: L'itinéraire oublié de Théodore Ber (1820-1900), and published an illustrated catalog.

== Selected publications ==
- "Les populations préhistoriques d'Ancón," Revue d'Anthropologie, 1875, 54-62.
- "Note sur les Indiens du Pérou"," Compte rendu du Congrès international des américanistes, 1875, 449-462.
- "Le rio Casa (Pérou)," Bulletin de la Société de Géographie, 1878, 181-184
- "Recherches ethnographiques sur la Bolivie et l'ancien Pérou," Congrès international des sciences ethnographiques, 1881, 688-697.
- "Tiahuanaco," Bulletin de la Société de Géographie, 1882, 577-592.
