= Inca mathematics =

Mathematics used by the Inca

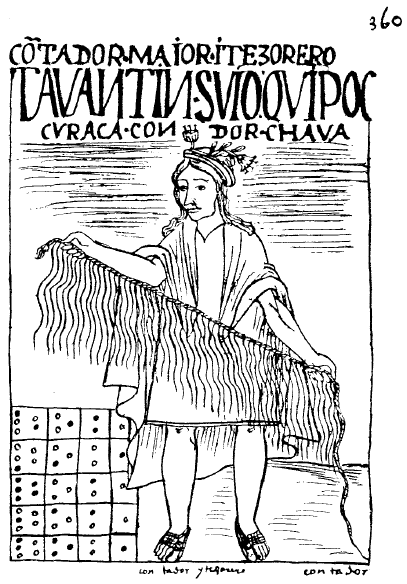
Quipukamayuq with his quipu and a yupana, the main instruments used by the Incas in mathematics.

The mathematics of the Incas (or of the Tawantinsuyu) was the set of numerical and geometric knowledge and instruments developed and used in the nation of the Incas before the arrival of the Spaniards. It can be mainly characterized by its usefulness in the economic field. The quipus and yupanas are proof of the importance of arithmetic in Inca state administration. This was embodied in a simple but effective arithmetic, for accounting purposes, based on the decimal numeral system; they too had a concept of zero, and mastered addition, subtraction, multiplication, and division. The mathematics of the Incas had an eminently applicative character to tasks of management, statistics, and measurement that was far from the Euclidean outline of mathematics as a deductive corpus, since it was suitable and useful for the needs of a centralized administration. (Note: This is deducted from the dictionaries of 'mathematics in Quechua' in current use and the known instruments: quipo and yupana)

On the other hand, the construction of roads, canals and monuments, as well as the layout of cities and fortresses, required the development of practical geometry, which was indispensable for the measurement of lengths and surfaces, in addition to architectural design. At the same time, they developed important measurement systems for length and volume, which took parts of the human body as reference. In addition, they used appropriate objects or actions that allowed to appreciate the result in another way, but relevant and effective.

== Inca numeral system ==
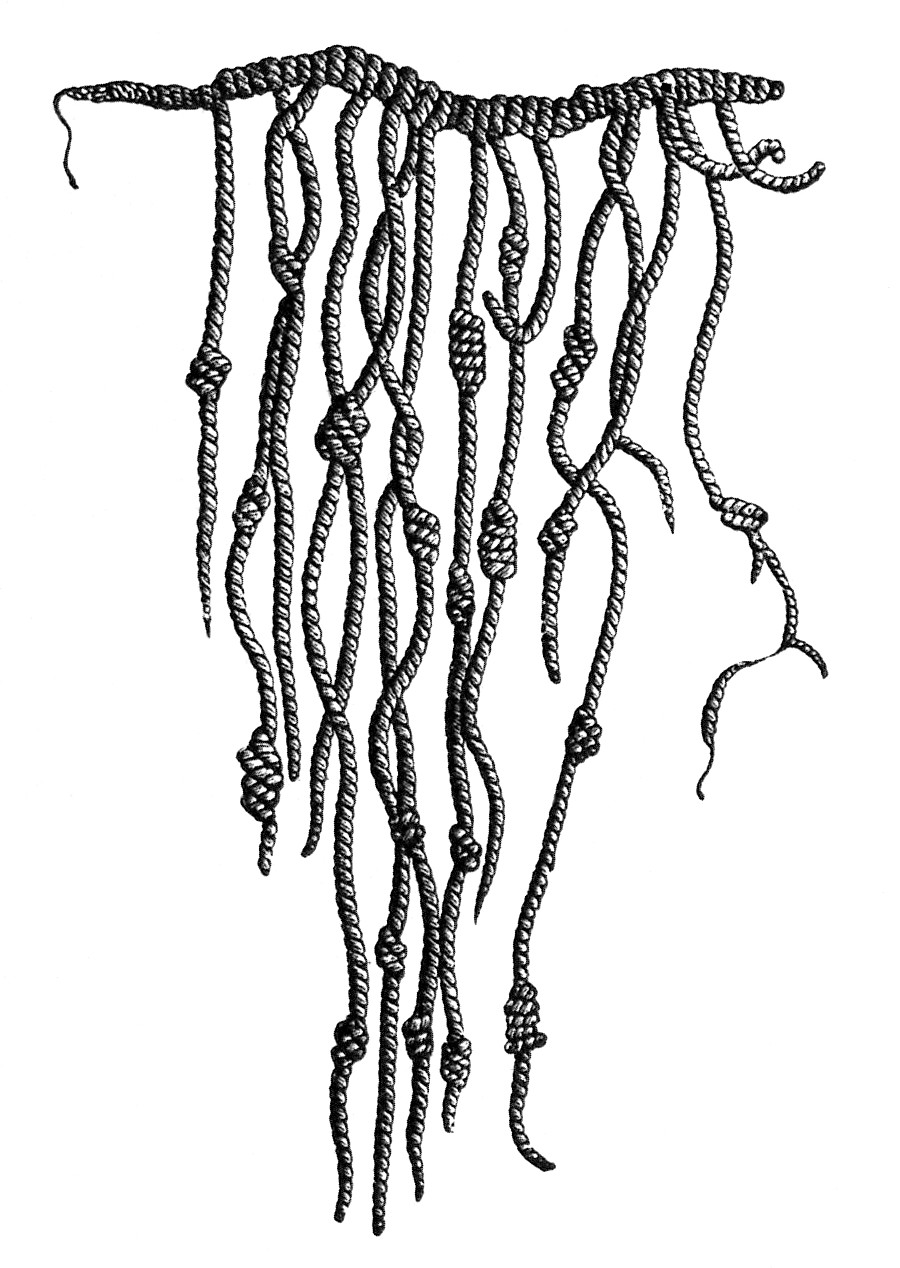
Representation of a quipu, an Inca accounting and mnemonic instrument.

The prevailing numeral system was the base-ten. One of the main references confirming this are the chronicles that present a hierarchy of organized authorities, using the decimal numeral system with its arithmometer: Quipu.

Responsible	Number of families
Puriq	1 family
Pisqa kamayuq	5 families
Chunka kamayuq	10 families
Pisqa chunkakamayuq	50 families
Pachak kamayuq	100 families
Pisqa pachakakamayuq	500 families
Waranqa kamayuq	1000 families
Pisqa waranqakamayuq	5000 families
Chunka waranqakamayuq	10 000 families

It is also possible to confirm the use of the decimal system in the Inca system by the interpretation of the quipus, which are organized in such a way that the knots — according to their location — can represent: units, tens, hundreds, etc.

However, the main confirmation of the use of this system is expressed in the denomination of the numbers in Quechua, in which the numbers are developed in decimal form. This can be appreciated in the following table: (Note: The Quechua used is that of Cusco)

Number	Quechua	Number	Quechua	Number	Quechua
1	Huk	11	Chunka hukniyuq	30	Kimsa chunka
2	Iskay	12	Chunka iskayniyuq	40	Tawa chunka
3	Kimsa	13	Chunka kimsayuq	50	Pisqa chunka
4	Tawa	14	Chunka tawayuq	60	Suqta chunka
5	Pisqa	15	Chunka pisqayuq	70	Qanchis chunka
6	Suqta	16	Chunka suqtayuq	80	Pusaq chunka
7	Qanchis	17	Chunka qanchisniyuq	90	Isqun chunka
8	Pusaq	18	Chunka pusaqniyuq	100	Pachak
9	Isqun	19	Chunka isqunniyuq	1000	Waranqa
10	Chunka	20	Iskay chunka	1 000 000	Hunu

== Accounting systems ==
=== Quipus ===
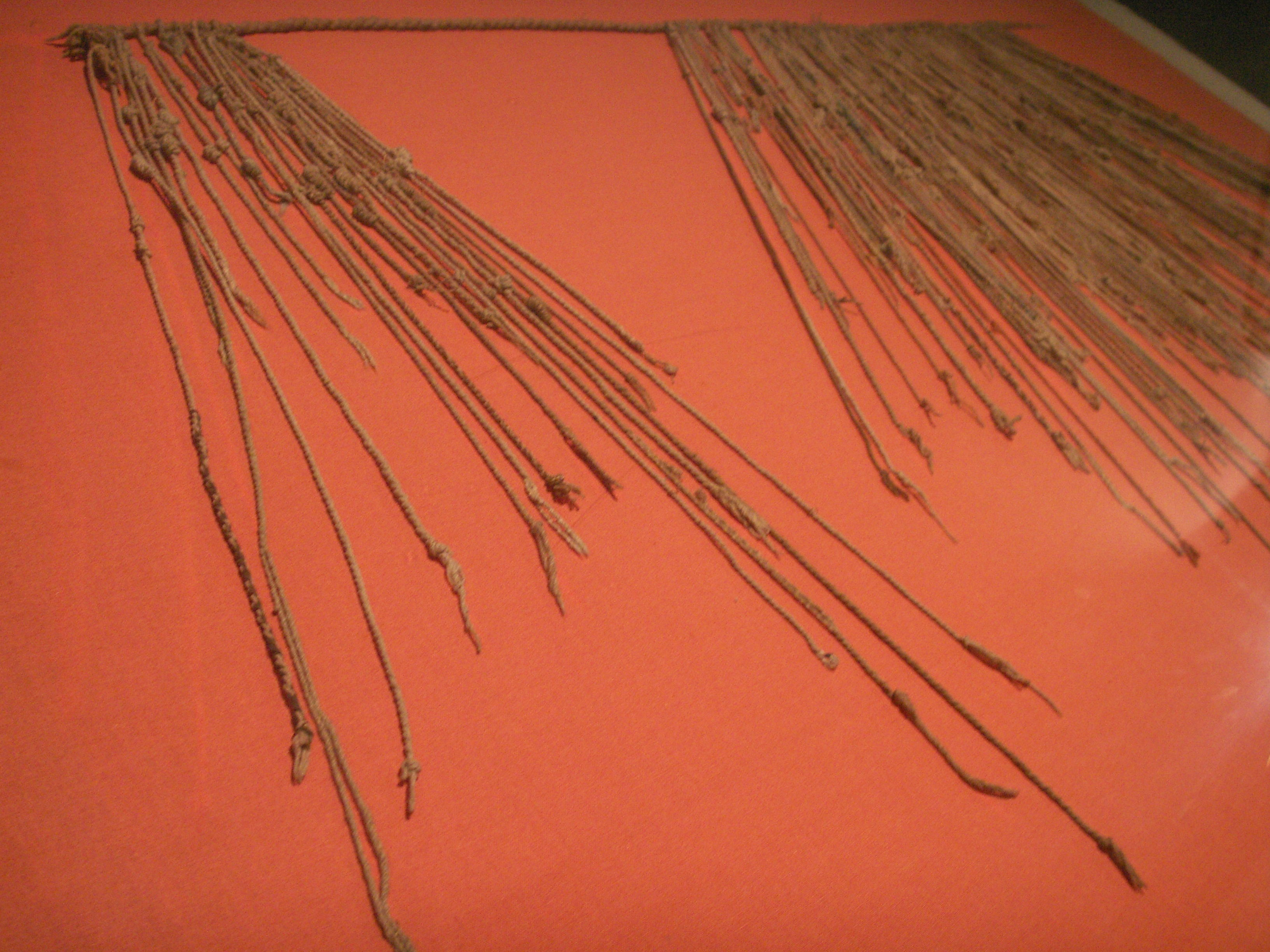
Inca Quipus, fundamental elements in the administration and accounting of the Inca Empire.

The quipus constituted a mnemonic system based on knotted strings used to record all kinds of quantitative or qualitative information; if they were dealing with the results of mathematical operations, only those previously performed on the "Inca abacuss" or yupanas were cancelled. Although one of its functions is related to mathematics — as it was an instrument capable of accounting — it was also used to store information related to census, product amount, and food kept in state warehouses. Quipus are even mentioned as instruments the Incas used to record their traditions and history in a different way than in writing.

Several chroniclers also mention the use of quipus to store historical news. (Note: Chroniclers with such diverse points of view as Garcilaso de la Vega, Guamán Poman, and Cieza de León (known for his historical rigor) mention the use of quipus to store historical data and poetry, although none of them mentions details of how that worked.) However, it has not yet been discovered how this system worked. In the Tahuantinsuyo, it was specialized personnel who handled the strings. They were known as quipucamayoc and they could be in charge of the strings of an entire region or suyu. Although the tradition is being lost, the quipus continue to be used as mnemonic instruments in some indigenous villages where they are used to record the product of the crops and the animals of the communities.

According to the Jesuit chronicler Bernabé Cobo, the Incas designated to certain specialists the tasks related to accounting. These specialists were called quipo camayos, in whom the Incas placed all their trust. In his study of the quipu sample VA 42527 (Museum für Völkerkunde, Berlin), Sáez-Rodríguez noted that, in order to close the accounting books of the chacras, certain numbers were ordered according to their value in the agricultural calendar, for which the khipukamayuq — the accountant entrusted with the granary — was directly in charge.

=== Yupanas ===
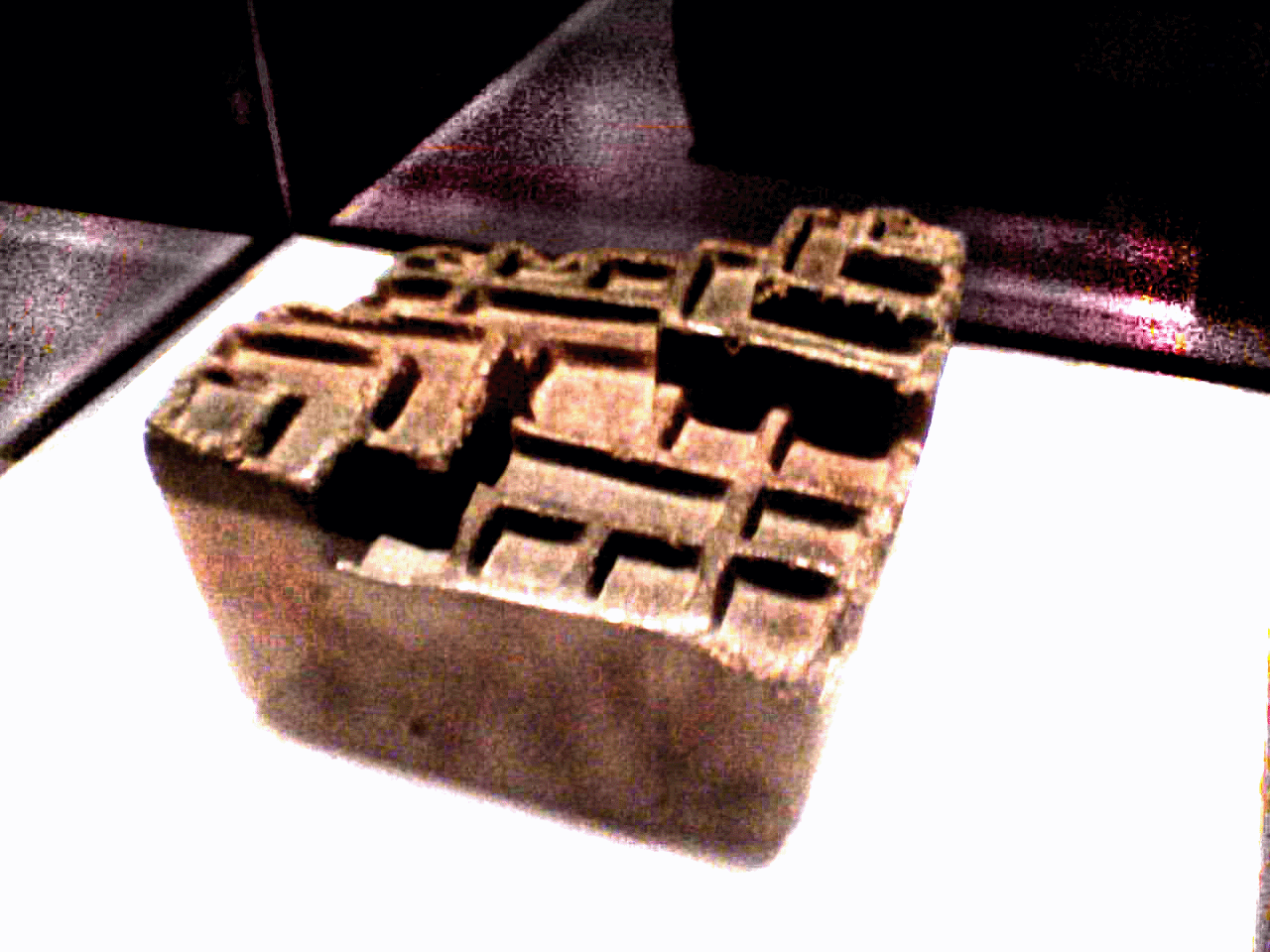
Yupana, also known as Inca abacus. Its accounting potential is still much debated.

In the case of numerical information, the mathematical operations were previously carried out on the abacuss or yupanas. These could be made of carved stone or clay, had boxes or compartments that corresponded to the decimal units, and were counted or marked with the help of small stones or grains of corn or quinoa. Units, tens, hundreds, etc. could be indicated according to whether they were implicit in each operation.

Recent research regarding the yupanas suggests that they allowed to calculate considerable numbers based on a probably non-decimal system, but based in relation to the number 40. If true, it is curious to note the coincidence between the geometric progression achieved in the yupana and the current processing systems; on the other hand, it is also contradictory that they based their accounting system on the number 40. If the investigations continue and this fact is confirmed, it would be necessary to compare its use with the decimal system, which according to the historical tradition and previous investigations, was the one used by the Incas.

In October 2010, Peruvian researcher Andrés Chirinos with the support of the Spanish Agency for International Development Cooperation (in Spanish, Agencia Española de Cooperación Internacional para el Desarrollo, AECID), reviewed drawings and ancient descriptions of the indigenous chronicler Guaman Poma de Ayala and finally deciphered the riddle of the yupana — that he calls "pre-Hispanic calculator" — as being capable of adding, subtracting, multiplying, and dividing. This made him hopeful to finally discover how the quipus worked as well.

== Units of measurement ==
There were different units of measurement for magnitudes such as length and volume in pre-Hispanic times. The Andean peoples, as in many other places in the world, took parts of the human body as a reference to establish their units of measurement. There was not a single system of units of obligatory and uniform use throughout the Andean world. Many documents and chronicles have recorded different systems of local origin that remained in use until the 16th century.

=== Length ===
Among the units of length measurement, there was the rikra (fathom), which is the distance measured between a man's thumbs with arms extended horizontally. The kukuchu tupu (kukush tupu) was equivalent to the Spanish codo (cubit) and was the distance measured from the elbow to the end of the fingers of the hand. There was also the capa (span), and the smallest was the yuku or jeme, which was the length between the index finger and the thumb, separating one from the other as much as possible. The distance between two villages would have been evaluated by the number of chasquis required to carry an errand from one village to the other. They would have used direct proportionality between the circumference of a sheepfold and the number of chacra partitions.

=== Surface ===
The tupu was the unit of measurement of surface area. In general terms it was defined as the plot of land required for the maintenance of a married couple without children. Every hatun runa or "common man" received a plot of land upon marriage and its production had to satisfy the basic needs of food and trade of the spouses. It did not correspond to an exact measurement, since its dimensions varied according to the conditions of each land and from one ethnic group to another. The quality of the soil was taken into consideration and the necessary rest time was calculated accordingly, which had to be considered after a certain number of agricultural campaigns. After that time, the couple could claim a new tupu from their curaca.

=== Capacity ===
Among the units of measurement of capacity there is the pokcha, which was equivalent to half a fanega or 27.7 liters. Some crops such as corn were measured in containers; liquids were measured in a variety of pitchers and jars. There were boxes of a variety of cántaros and tinajas, and straw or reed boxes in which objects were kept. These boxes were also used in warehouses to store delicate or exquisite products, such as dried fruits. Coca leaves were measured in runcu or large baskets. Other baskets were known as ysanga. Among these measures of capacity there is the poctoy or purash (almozada), which is equivalent to the portion of grains or flour that can be kept in the concavity formed with the hands together. The ancient inhabitants of the Andes knew the scales of saucers and nets as well as the huipe, an instrument similar to steelyards. Apparently, its presence is associated with the works of jewelry and metallurgy, trades in which it is necessary to know the exact weights to use the right proportions of the alloys.

=== Volume ===
Especially the volume of their colcas (trojas) and their tambos (state warehouses, located in key points of the Qhapaq Ñan). They used the runqu (rongos: bales), portable containers or ishanka (baskets) or the capacity of a chacra. They would have handled the proportionality of the volumes of prisms with respect to their heights — without varying the bases.

=== Time ===
To measure time, they used the day (workday), which could include a morning, even an afternoon. Time was also useful, indirectly, to appreciate the distance between two cities; for example, 20 days from Cajamarca to Cusco was the accepted time measurement.

Months, years, and the phases of the moon — much consulted for the tasks of sowing, aporques and harvests and in navigation — were also measured in days.

== See also ==
- Inca Empire
- History of the Incas
- History of Peru
- Mathematics

== Bibliography ==
- Espinoza Soriano, Waldemar (2003). Los Incas, economía, sociedad y estado en la era del Tahuantinsuyo (in Spanish). Lima: Editorial Sol 90. ISBN 9972-891-79-8.
- Muxica Editores (2001). Culturas Prehispánicas (in Spanish). Muxica Editores. ISBN 9972-617-10-6.
