= Champollion Museum =

House in Figeac, Lot

Coordinates: 44°36′35″N 2°02′04″E

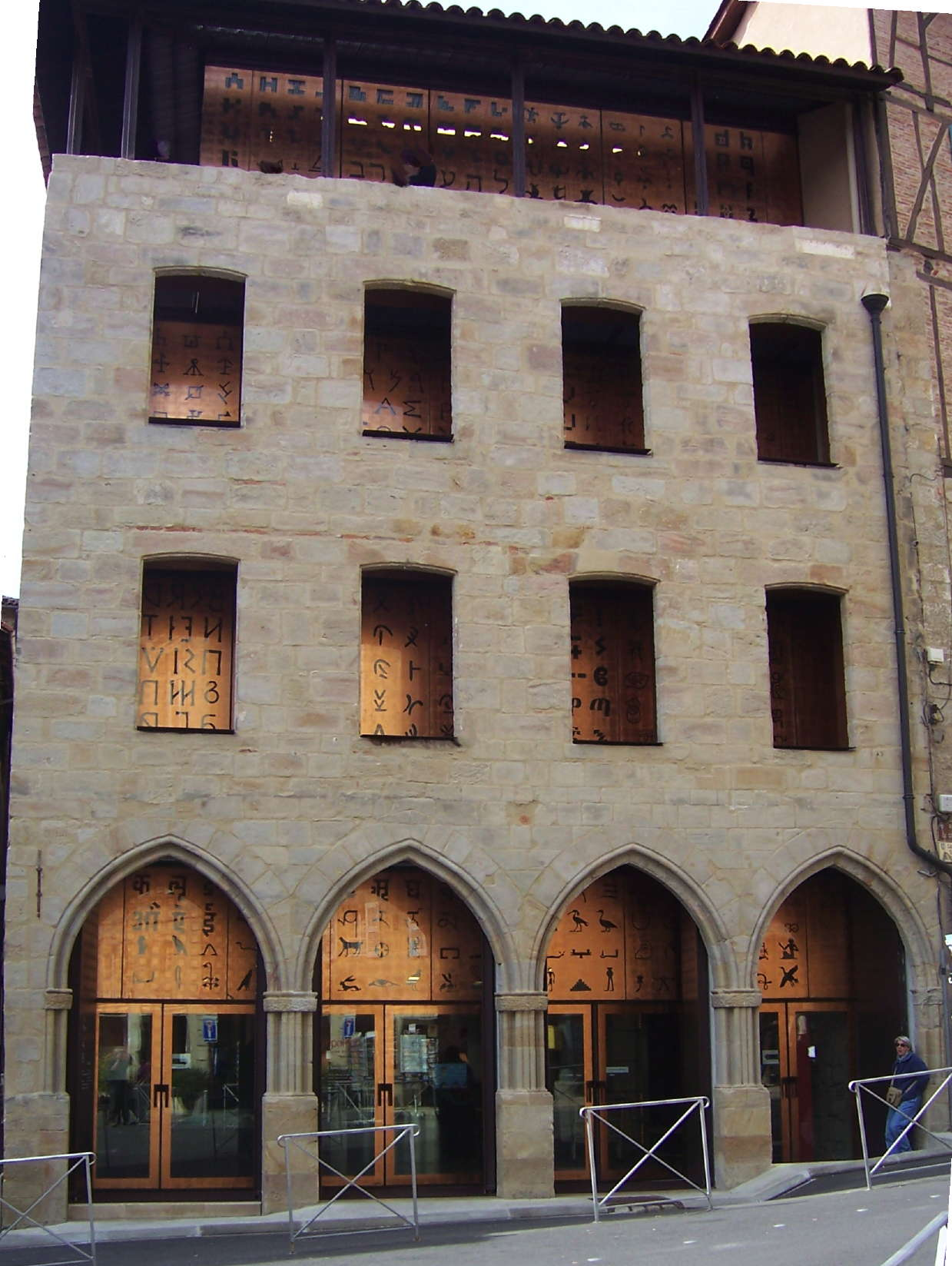
Facade of the museum.

The Champollion Museum (French: Musée Champollion) is located in Figeac, Lot, France.

It houses a collection devoted to Figeac's most famous son, Jean-François Champollion.

It was inaugurated 19 December 1986 in the presence of President François Mitterrand and Jean Leclant, secrétaire perpétuel of the Académie des Inscriptions et Belles-Lettres. After two years of building work and extension, the museum re-opened in 2007. Besides Champollion's life and discoveries, the museum also recounts the history of writing. The whole façade is covered in pictograms, from the original ideograms of the whole world.

== History ==
In 1986, due to the efforts of the city of Figeac, the first museum dedicated to Jean-François Champollion, known for deciphering Egyptian hieroglyphs, was opened.

In 2014, the museum consecrated an exhibition to the explorations of Théodore Ber, also a native of Figeac, 40 ans dans les andes: L'itinéraire oublié de Théodore Ber (1820–1900), and published an illustrated catalog.

The museum was then installed in the house where the Egyptologist was born, which was thus saved from destruction and restored. This house has been listed as a historical monument since 1973.

In 1991, the city celebrated the bicentenary of the birth of Figeac de Champollion by creating the Place des Scriptures, located just behind the museum. In August 1999, the city began a program to renovate and extend the museum. Work began on October 3, 2005. More than four million euros were financed by Europe (29.84%), the State (22.34%), the region (25%), the department (2.43%) and the town of Figeac (20.39%). The architect Alain Moatti was responsible for the design of the project.

The new Champollion museum, renamed Les Ecritures du Monde, opened its doors on July 28, 2007. Its facade with 1,000 letters, made of stone, glass and metal, allows access to the museum via Place Champollion. The graphic designer Pierre di Sciullo has drawn hieroglyphs and other writing signs from around the world on large openwork copper sheets.

The museum's collections recount the history of writing, which appeared in different parts of the world 5,300 years ago for the oldest. Among others, objects from Mexico, China and Mesopotamia inscribed with a brush, reed pen or pen are displayed.

The museum extends over four levels and eight rooms, it is fully accessible to the disabled, with the exception of the loggias which, at each level, allow a closer observation of the facade with a thousand letters and offer a view on the town and Place Champollion, restored in 2008.

In addition to the permanent collection accessible all year round which brings together more than 600 objects or documents, the museum regularly offers meetings for all audiences (readings, conferences, concerts, screenings, etc.) and temporary exhibitions which allow to explore one of the civilizations covered in the permanent collections.

== Bibliography ==
- Van Uffelen, Chris. Contemporary Museums – Architecture, History, Collections, Braun Publishing, 2010, ISBN 978-3-03768-067-4, pages 190–193.
