= Gabriela Wiener =

Peruvian writer (born 1975)

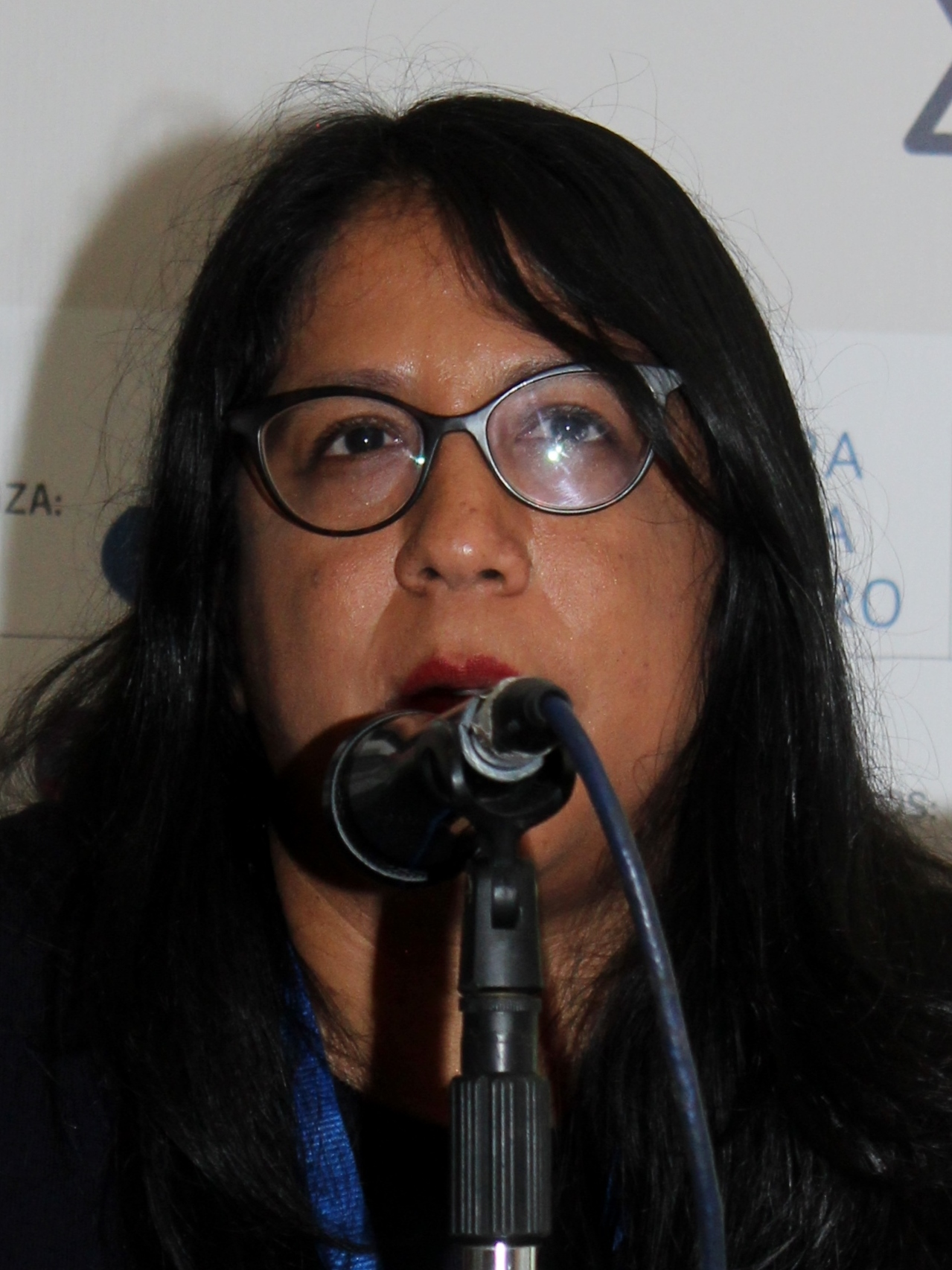
- Gabriela Wiener at the 2018 Santiago International Book Fair
- Born: 1975 (age 50–51); Lima, Peru
- Education: Pontifical Catholic University of Peru; University of Barcelona
- Writing career
- Genres: poetry journalism
- Notable work: Huaco retrato
- Notable awards: City of Barcelona Award (2025)

Gabriela Wiener (born 1975 Lima) is a Peruvian writer, chronicler, poet and journalist. She is part of the group of new Latin American chroniclers. She has lived in Spain since 2003.

== Life ==
She is the daughter of the prominent political analyst and Peruvian journalist Raúl Wiener and social worker Elsi Bravo. She is a possible descendant of the Austrian-French explorer Charles Wiener.

She studied linguistics and literature at the Pontifical Catholic University of Peru and received a master's degree in historical culture and communications from the University of Barcelona. She lived in Barcelona while completing her degree from 2003 to 2011. Since then, she has lived in Madrid.

She worked for the newspaper El Comercio and was a member of the editorial board of Lateral magazine. She was also editor in chief of the Spanish magazine Primera Línea and the Spanish edition of Marie Claire magazine.

She has written for a variety of publications, including Corriere della Sera, Words Without Borders, The White Review, Virginia Quarterly Review, Orsai, Esquire, Revue XXI, Clarin, El Universal, El Mercurio, and La Vanguardia.

She is currently a columnist for the Peruvian newspaper La República, a correspondent for the magazine Etiqueta Negra, and a frequent contributor to El País. She also conducts interviews for La República and La Mula.

She is the author of the books Llamada perdida; Sexografías; Nueve Lunas; Mozart, the iguana with priapism and other stories; and the book of poems Exercises for the hardening of the spirit.

== Selected works ==
- Cosas que deja la gente cuando se va, Pontificia Universidad Católica del Perú, Estudios Generales Letras, 2007. OCLC 748796052
- Llamada perdida, Editorial: Estruendomudo, 2014. ISBN 9786124165146; Malpaso Ediciones, 2015, ISBN 9788415996705, OCLC 920340780
- Sexografías, San Isidro, Lima, Perú: Editorial Planeta, 2015. ISBN 9786124689444, OCLC 933784470
  - Sexografías, Restless Books, 2018. ISBN 9781632061591, OCLC 1011111434
- Nueve Lunas, Lima, Perú: Seix Barral, 2015. ISBN 9786124689451, OCLC 951812608
- Mozart, the iguana with priapism and other stories.
- Ejercicios para el endurecimiento del espíritu, Lima, Perú: Pesopluma, 2016. ISBN 9786124682568, OCLC 961214186
