= Inca animal husbandry =

Animal care in the Inca Empire

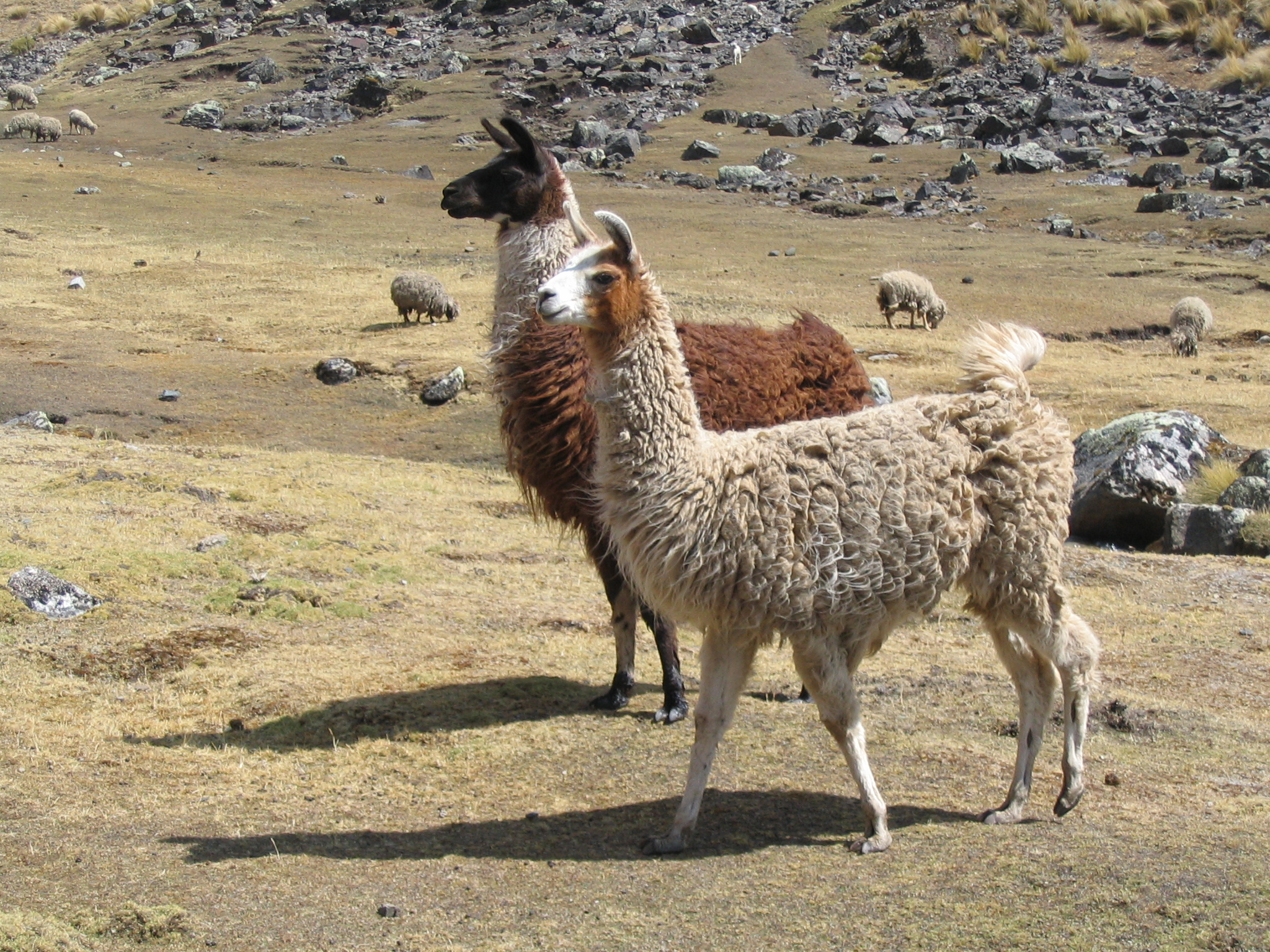
The camelids were an essential part of the Tawantinsuyu. The Inca state was concerned with sourcing both meat and fiber from these animals.

Inca animal husbandry refers to how in the pre-Hispanic andes, camelids played an important role in the economy. In particular, the llama and alpaca—the only camelids domesticated by Andean people— were raised in large-scale houses and used for different purposes within the production system of the Incas. Likewise, two other species of undomesticated camelids were used: the vicuña and the guanaco. The guanacos were hunted by means of chacos (collective hunts).

The Inca people used tools such as: stones, knives or tumis, axes that, according to chroniclers, were made of stone and bronze, and ropes that were made by them in their leisure time. Many of these tools were used to shear the camelids, which were then set free; in this way, they ensured that their numbers were maintained. Guanacos, on the other hand, were hunted for their meat, which was highly prized.

== Camelid raising ==
The South American camelids were a valuable resource. Their meat was consumed fresh or in charqui and chalona; their wool was used to make threads and fabrics; their bones, hide, fat and excrement had diverse applications such as musical instruments, footwear, medicines and fertilizer respectively. They were also preferred animals for religious sacrifices. The communal camelid herds were under the care of young people, whose ages ranged from twelve to sixteen years old.

In areas where the communal herds were large, such as the altiplano region, where pastures were far away, it is likely that their care was in the hands of a full-time specialist. The chroniclers mention two Quechua names for the shepherds: llama michi—which Garcilaso associates with low social status—and llama camayos, which designated the llamas caretaker or employee responsible for the herds. The state herdsmen were responsible for the animals under their charge, whose accounting and supervision were done by officials appointed by the state.

=== Classification ===
The jesuit José de Acosta mentions that in Ancient Peru, the division of camelid herds was made according to the colors of the animals. There were white, black, brown and moromoros, as they called those of various colors. In addition, the chronicler said that the colors were taken into account for the various sacrifices, according to their traditions and beliefs. Garcilaso de la Vega adds that in the herds, when a calf was of a different color, once it had grown up, it was sent to its corresponding herd. This division by shades facilitated their counting in the quipus, which were made with wool of the same color as that of the animals they wanted to count.

==== Domesticated ====
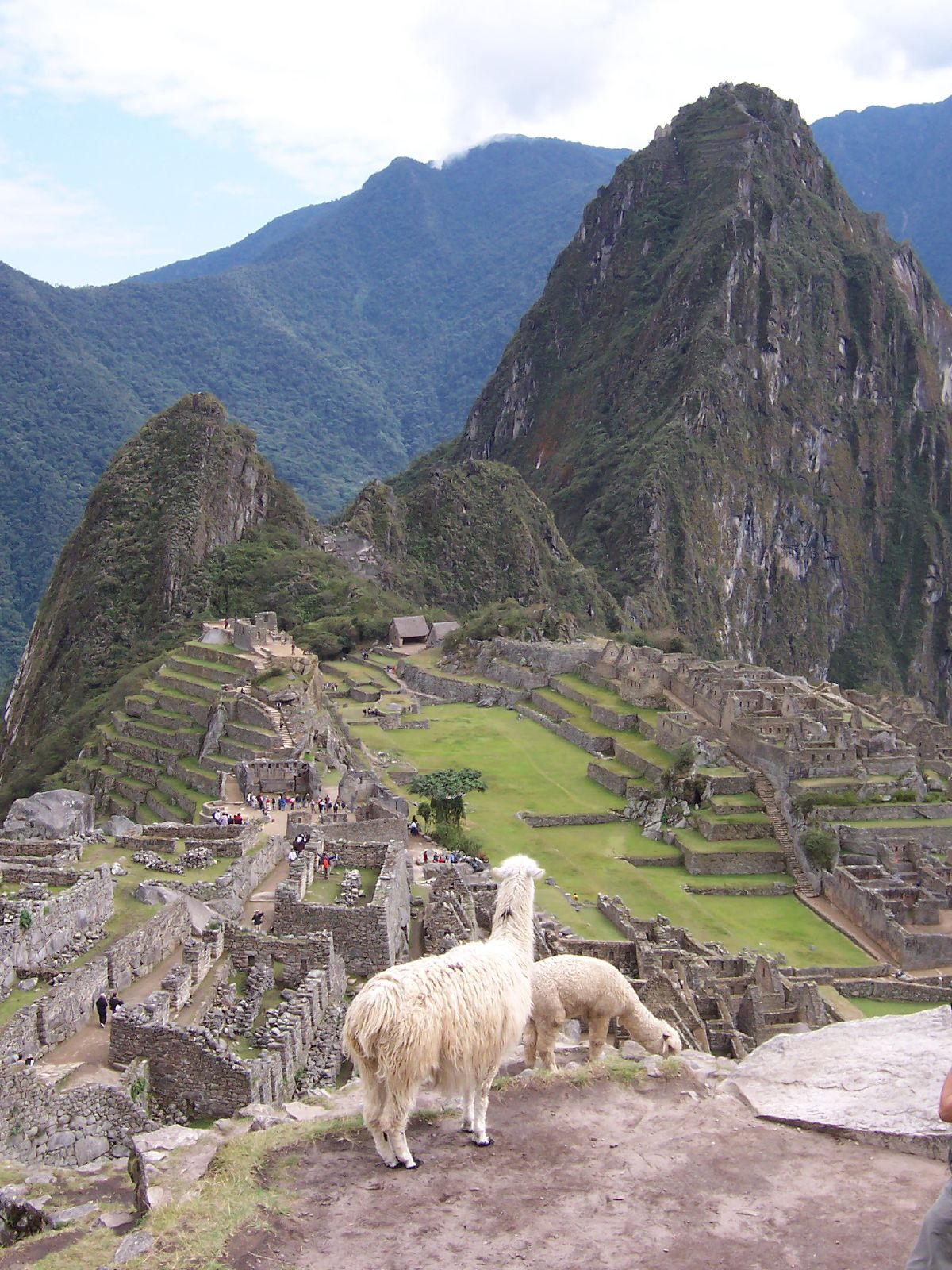
View of llamas in the citadel of Machu Picchu.

The llama and alpaca were especially important in the Andean economy.

- Llama: the resources provided by the llama were used to the maximum. Thus, its wool was spun to transform it into clothing for the people of the sierra, as the inhabitants of the coast used the cotton to make their clothing. Their meat was consumed fresh as well as sun-dried and dehydrated (charqui); the latter allowed its preservation and storage in warehouses. In addition, they were bled through a vein in the jaw to prepare a special meal with the blood. The hides were used to prepare ropes, sandals and other objects, while their dried excrement was an excellent fuel, particularly at high altitudes where there were no trees to obtain firewood. Perhaps one of the most prized uses of the llama was as a pack animal, as it could carry up to 40 kilograms in weight and move easily up the steepest heights. Llama caravans were mainly made up of males. For longer journeys, such as between the Collao and the coast, "new males" of about two years of age were preferred. The herd traveled from early morning to midday, stopping at places with water and pasture. The maintenance of the animals was not difficult, since they were not provided with any other forage than the grasses found along the route. The animals were fed during the afternoon and chewed their cud at night. Finally, they were also sacrificed as offerings and their organs were used to read omens.
- Alpaca: they basically provided wool—of inferior quality to that of the vicuña—for the finest and most luxurious fabrics. The pastures necessary for their farming followed similar patterns to those of agricultural land tenure. The ayllus had pastures for their animals, as did the curacas, the great lords of the macro-ethnicities, the huacas and the special pastures of the Inca. Both archaeological research and archival documents refer to the existence of camelid herds on the coast long before the Inca conquest: from pre-ceramic times. They must have fed in the hilly region and in the carob forests, which today are almost totally depredated. When the hills dried out, the animals fed on the pods of the carob trees.

==== Non-domesticated ====
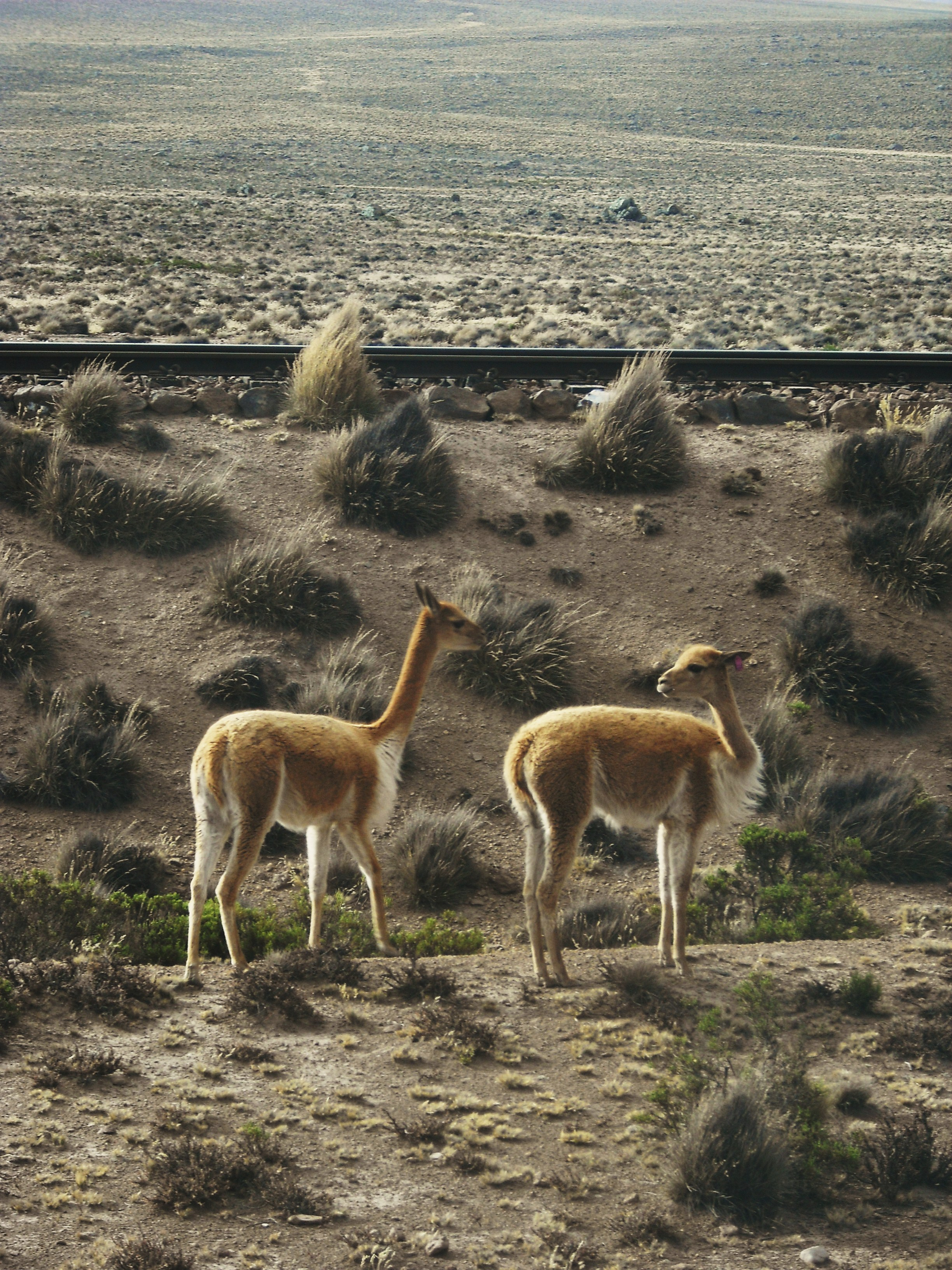
Vicuñas in the Salinas y Aguada Blanca National Reserve.

The vicuña and the guanaco had not been domesticated in Inca times.

- Vicuña: the chroniclers affirm that the vicuñas were never killed. They were used to obtain their wool, which was highly prized. The clothing of the Incas and that which would be used for offerings was made from this wool. It was hunted by means of the chacos (collective hunts) to be sheared and then set free; in this way they ensured that their numbers would be maintained.
- Guanaco: the most widespread camelid in geographical terms was the guanaco, as it was found from the subequatorial areas to the Tierra del Fuego. About guanacos, the chronicler Pedro Cieza de León says, they were hunted to make charqui, which was stored in warehouses "to feed the army". They were hunted for their meat, which was highly prized.

=== Consumption Overview ===
The visit of Garci Diez de San Miguel to the province of Chucuito is a document that provides interesting information regarding the livestock wealth of that region. From it we know that a common Inca, for example, could own up to a thousand heads of camelids, while a principal lord could own up to fifty thousand. Cattle raising certainly constituted an important source of wealth in pre-Hispanic times.

The chroniclers point out that the meat of all camelids was eaten, but due to the restrictions that existed for its slaughter, its consumption must have been a luxury. The population probably had access to fresh meat only in the army or on ceremonial occasions, when the slaughtered animals were widely distributed.

In colonial times, the pastures were disappearing or becoming poorer due exclusively to the massive presence of the animals introduced by the Spaniards and their eating habits. The Andean environment underwent a considerable change with the domestic animals that arrived with the Spanish conquest.

== Other animals farming ==
The animals domesticated in the Inca Empire were mainly camelids. They also domesticated the cuy or guinea pig. Although no significant samples of guinea pigs have been found in the Andes, it is believed that their domestication was minor or in small proportions. Currently, the guinea pig is part of the diet of the Andean peoples. Likewise, ducks and payments to Mother Nature in the Inca Empire were raised at home because their meat was highly valued.

According to chronicles of the Spanish colonization, the inhabitants of the high jungle raised tame and domestic animals such as the cuyes and turkeys. (Note: Excerpt from Chapter VIII of "Historia del Nuevo Mundo", by Father Bernabé Cobo. Boletín de la Sociedad Geográfica de Lima, Year 111, volume N.º 115 (2002))

== See also ==
- Inca Empire
- Inca agriculture
- Mathematics of the Incas
- History of Peru

== Bibliography ==
- Rostworowski, María (2004). Enciclopedia temática del Perú: Incas (in Spanish). Lima: Orbis Ventures. ISBN 9972-752-01-1.
- Culturas Prehispánicas (in Spanish). Muxica Editores. 2001. ISBN 9972-617-10-6.
- Historia Universal: América precolombina (in Spanish). Editorial Sol. 2003. ISBN 9972-891-79-8.
