= Figeac Aero =

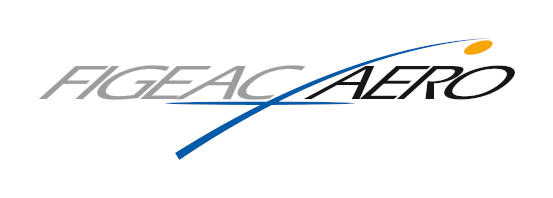
- Type: S.A. (corporation)
- Traded as: Euronext: FGA; CAC All-Share
- Industry: aerospace
- Founded: January 1989
- Founder: Jean-Claude Maillard
- Headquarters: Figeac, France
- Revenue: ▲€432.3 million (2024/25)
- Net income: ▲€3.6 million (2024/25)
- Number of employees: 3,300 (2022)

Figeac Aero is a company specializing in the subcontracting of aeronautical equipment. By 2023, it is the leading European subcontractor in the sector. The company produces large parts, engine parts, precision parts and sub-assemblies. Publicly listed on the regulated share market since 2013, the company has achieved a turnover of 486 million euros in 2025.

Jean-Claude Maillard founded the company in 1989.

== History ==
1989: French engineer, Jean-Claude Maillard, founds the company with starting capital of €18,000.

1994: Figeac Aero acquires MTI, a specialist of sheet metal work, mechanical welding, and large part machining. The group also becomes the first aerospace sub-contractor to use speed machining.

2002: Positioning itself as a large structural parts specialist, Figeac revenues double to €15.4 million, with operating income quadrupling to €870,000 (6% operating margin).

2004: The group acquires Mécabrive Industries, which specializes in machining, surface treatment, and parts assembly. Revenues reach € 29.2 million.

2006: Figeac is awarded ISO 9001 (international standards for quality management systems) and EN 9100 (international standards related to aerospace and defense manufacturers). By then, group top line is reported at €42.2 million.

2007: Amid its growth, Figeac opens an apprentice training center and expands its human resource initiatives.

2010: Airbus selects Figeac among 20 other global suppliers to produce the Airbus A350 nosecone and engine pylon, prompting the business to specialize in machining of steel, titanium, and Inconel. In addition, Stelia Aerospace selects the group to manufacture detailed parts in Tunisia. Revenues are at a reported €59.4 million.

2012: The company founds Figeac Aéro Picardie, located in Méaulte (a commune in Somme Department). The subsidiary specializes in mounting large aircraft sub-assemblies. Additionally, the Figeac Aéro Tunisia subsidiary begins operation. The Tunisian operation reports revenues of €1.3 million while the parent company reaches the €109.5 million.

2013: The company IPO’s on Altemext Paris (now, Euronext Paris) at €9.20 per share. The share capital is split between the 93% majority shareholder and 7% free float.

2014: Figeac undergoes a series of growth initiatives, including:

Acquisition of the Sonaca production site in Wichita, Kansas. The operation is renamed Figeac Aéro North America, which specializes in surface treatment, microbead blasting, and shot peen forming. It is also engaged in structures assembly. This move exposed the French parent company to US-dollar transactions and North American deals.

Figeac signs a $60 million agreement with US aerostructures business, Spirit Aerosystems.

Figeac also sign a cooperation agreement with VSMPO-AVISMA, granting the French aerostructures business access to Titanium from Russia. This deal would gain attention following the 2022 Russo-Ukrainian war, when the European Commission conducted a study of the European titanium industry.

Safran selects Figeac to produce parts for the CFM LEAP engines. The deal, which is valued at $500 million over a term of 10 years, prompted Figeac to construct a dedicated 7,500 square meter site in Figeac, France. Under this deal, the group is responsible for casings for ferrules (LEAP-1A and -1B) and inter-vein shrouds (LEAP-1A/-1C and 1B).

Group revenues reach €162.3 million.

2015: With its top line surpassing € 200 million, Figeac signs an additional $40 million agreement with Safran to produce titanium segments for the CFM LEAP program. Moreover, it signs a $230 million contract with Embraer S.A. to produce parts for the E-Jets program. The group founds a new subsidiary in Casablanca and opens a new site in Sonora, Mexico. Figeac signs a deal with Groupe Latécoère for work on the Boeing 787. Finally, the company issues a private placement, issuing € 20 million new shares, diluting the majority shareholder to 88%.

2016: Figeac Aero signs a long term agreement with Stelia in the amount of $400 million.
