= Charles Wiener =

Austrian-French explorer

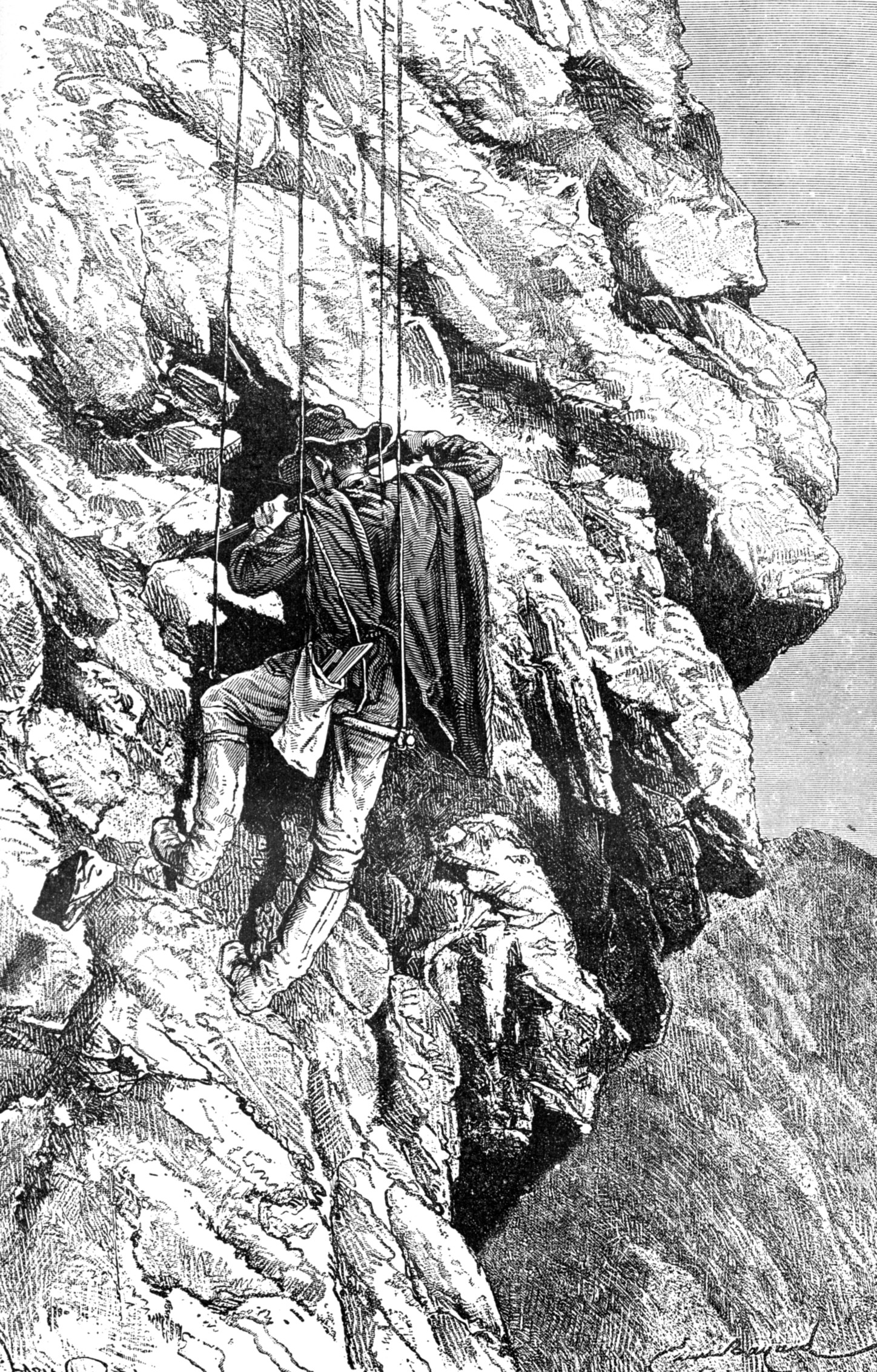
Charles Wiener depicting himself excavating a burial cave.

Charles Wiener (1851–1913) was an Austrian-French scientist-explorer. Born in Vienna, he is perhaps best known as the explorer who traveled extensively in Peru, climbed the Illimani and came close to re-discovering Machu Picchu.

== Biography ==
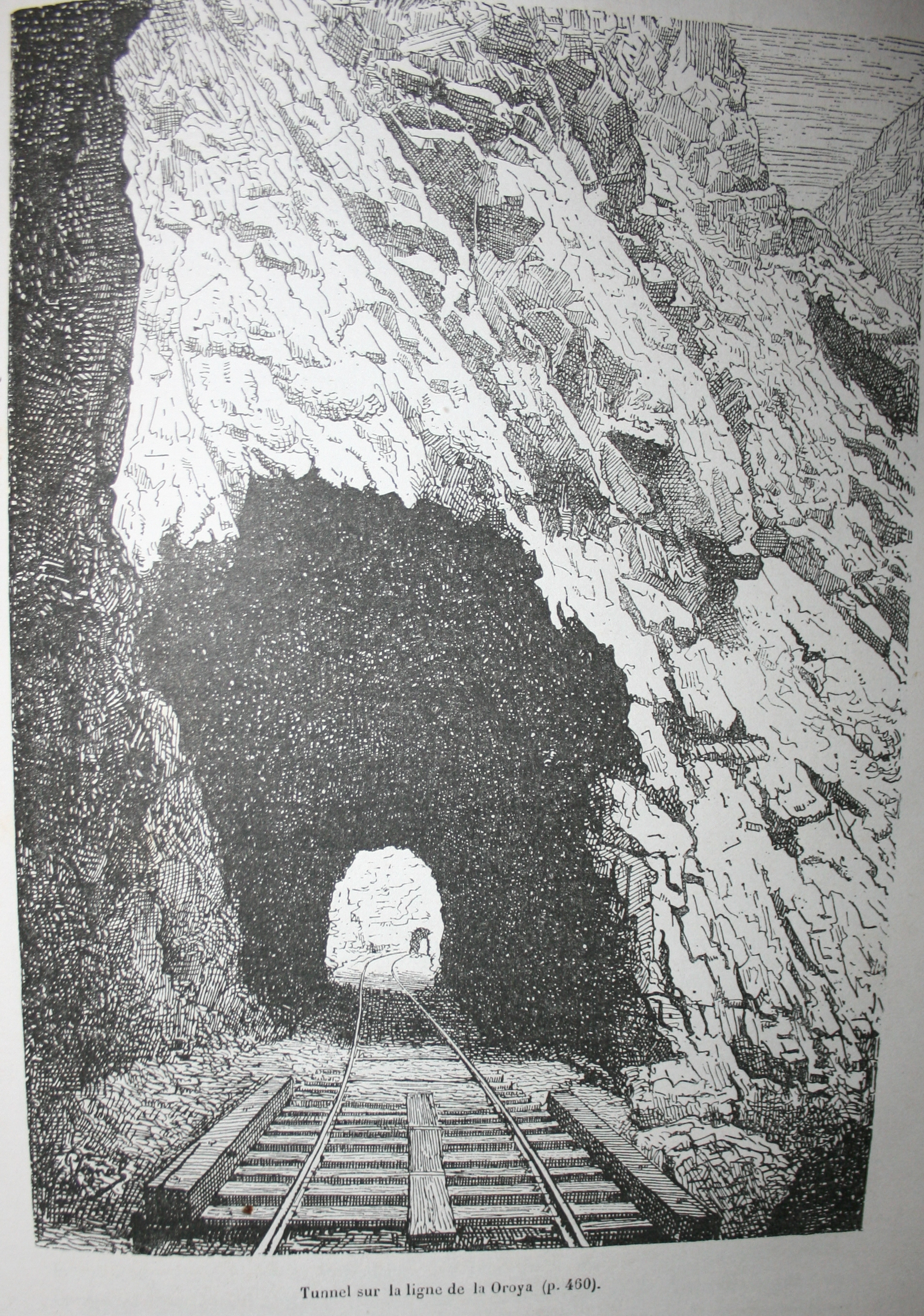
The drawing by Charles Wiener, "tunnel on the La Oroya line" in his book Pérou et Bolivie - Récit de voyage was used by Hergé in his album of Tintin "Le temple du Soleil"

His first intellectual stirrings were in the area of linguistics, since he published a small work on this subject in 1873. Later, he was a teacher of German in Paris. He received a doctor's degree in philosophy from the University of Rostock with a dissertation edited with the title of Essai sur les institutions politiques, religieuses, économiques et sociales de l´Empire des Incas, Paris, 1874, work for which he contacted other students of Mesoamerican antiquity.

According to Kim MacQuarrie, Wiener, in his exploration,

would travel from Ollantaytambo up over the Panticalla Pass until he arrived at the Urubamba River at the bridge crossing of Chuquichaca. In a book he published in 1880, Wiener wrote of how locals in Ollantaytambo had told him about [ancient Inca towns] . . . . Wiener did . . . make a detailed map of the Urubamba Valley, on which he included two peaks and marked them with the names Matchopicchu and Huyanapicchu.

"Wiener traveled in Peru in 1875, a few years after Herman Göhring (a fellow explorer) and [was] told in Ollantaytambo about certain ruins, including those at “Huainan-Picchu” and “Matcho Picchu,” but he was unable to reach them during his visit." Consequently, Wiener's own account of his travels, published as Perou et Bolivie (Paris, 1880), "contains a map, “Vallee de Santa-Ana,” incorrectly placing “Huayna picchu” south of “Malcho picchu” on the east side of the Urubamba." "The map was apparently published in Paris by the Societe de Geographie in 1877, three years before the publication of Wiener’s book." Also of note is that "Hiram Bingham (the ultimate re-discoverer of Machu Picchu) was familiar with Wiener’s book [and] when a Cuzqueño told Bingham that he had seen "ruins 'finer than Choqquequirau' at a place called Huayna Picchu," Bingham thought that the "report resembled Wiener’s account."

Wiener got some support from the French government for his expeditions, but found himself in competition with Théodore Ber. The rivalry degenerated into a bitter antipathy, and Wiener tried to bad-mouth Ber, who had been a member of the Commune of Paris, with the French authorities.

Also of note is that Wiener is mentioned in Mario Vargas Llosa's novel The Storyteller as the Frenchman "who in 1880 came across 'two Machiguenga corpses, ritually abandoned in the river,' which he decapitated and added to his collection of curiosities collected in the Peruvian jungle."

Gabriela Wiener's novel/memoir Undiscovered (2023; Huaco retrato in the Spanish original) reflects on her dual heritage: descendant of both Wiener and the mestiza María Rodríguez, unrecognized by French specialists in Wiener's work, and tormented by an elliptical reference in Wiener's travel narrative to an Indigenous boy, Juan, whom he may have brought back with him to Paris.
