= Code of the Quipu =

1981 book by Marcia Ascher and Robert Ascher

- 'Mathematics of the Incas: Code of the Quipu', the 1997 revised edition with corrections
- Author: Marcia Ascher; Robert Ascher
- Subject: The quipu in Inca culture
- Publisher: University of Michigan Press; Dover Books
- Publication date: 1981, 1997

Code of the Quipu is a book on the Inca system of recording numbers and other information by means of a quipu, a system of knotted strings. It was written by mathematician Marcia Ascher and anthropologist Robert Ascher, and published as Code of the Quipu: A Study in Media, Mathematics, and Culture by the University of Michigan Press in 1981. Dover Books republished it with corrections in 1997 as Mathematics of the Incas: Code of the Quipu. The Basic Library List Committee of the Mathematical Association of America has recommended its inclusion in undergraduate mathematics libraries.

== Topics ==
The book describes (necessarily by inference, as there is no written record beyond the quipu the themselves) the uses of the quipu, for instance in accounting and taxation. Although 400 quipu are known to survive, the book's study is based on a selection of 191 of them, described in a companion databook. It analyzes the mathematical principles behind the use of the quipu, including a decimal form of positional notation, the concept of zero, rational numbers, and arithmetic, and the way the spatial relations between the strings of a quipu recorded hierarchical and categorical information.

It argues that beyond its use in recording numbers, the quipu acted as a method for planning for future events, and as a writing system for the Inca, and that it provides a tangible representation of "insistence", the thematic concerns in Inca culture for symmetry and spatial and hierarchical connections.

The initial chapters of the book provide an introduction to Inca society and the physical organization of a quipu (involving the colors, size, direction, and hierarchy of its strings), and discussions of repeated themes in Inca society and of the place of the quipu and its makers in that society. Later chapters discuss the mathematical structure of the quipu and of the information it stores, with reference to similarly-structured data in modern society and exercises that ask students to construct quipus for representing modern data.

== Audience and reception ==
The book is aimed at a general audience, and does not require any specialized knowledge of its readers, but can also be appreciated by mathematicians and anthropologists, or possibly used as undergraduate course material.

Although reviewers Sal Restivo and Susan Niles criticize the book for a lack of originality in its insights, reviewer M. P. Closs disagrees. And although criticizing the book for its lack of a bibliography and index, and for leaving the false impression that Inca culture became extinct without leaving any successors, reviewer Gary Urton writes that the book "is an important contribution to ... the history of science and to our understanding of Inca thought and culture". Similarly, Niles criticizes the lack of a bibliography and the lack of exercises drawn from Inca rather than modern culture, and finds the material on insistence unconvincing, but recommends the book "to all Andeanists and to anyone interested in material culture". And reviewer Donald E. Thompson calls it "a delightful, clearly written, and informative book".
