= Dorothy Locke =

American fencer

Personal information
- Nationality: American
- Born: Dorothy Brown Locke; January 8, 1912 Brooklyn, New York, United States
- Died: February 4, 2005 (aged 93) Jamaica Plain, Massachusetts, United States
- Spouse: Edwin C. Bertsche

Sport
- Country: United States
- Sport: Fencing
- Event: Women's foil

Achievements and titles
- Olympic finals: 1932, 1936
- National finals: 3× U.S. National Champion, 3× Metropolitan Champion

Dorothy Brown Locke (January 8, 1912 – February 4, 2005) was an American foil fencer. She competed in the women's individual foil events at both the 1932 and 1936 Summer Olympics for the United States.

She was the daughter of Leland Leland Locke, a mathematician and educator, best known for his work towards deciphering ancient Andean knot records called quipus.

Locke was a native of Brooklyn, New York. She graduated from the Packer Collegiate Institute and Adelphi College, and she also attended Long Island College of Medicine.

In 1937, Locke became engaged to Edwin C. Bertsche, a Columbia University graduate and chemical engineer working with E. I. du Pont de Nemours & Co.

== See also ==
- List of USFA Hall of Fame members
