= Santa Valley quipus =

Set of Andean knotted cord records

Quipu from the Santa Valley
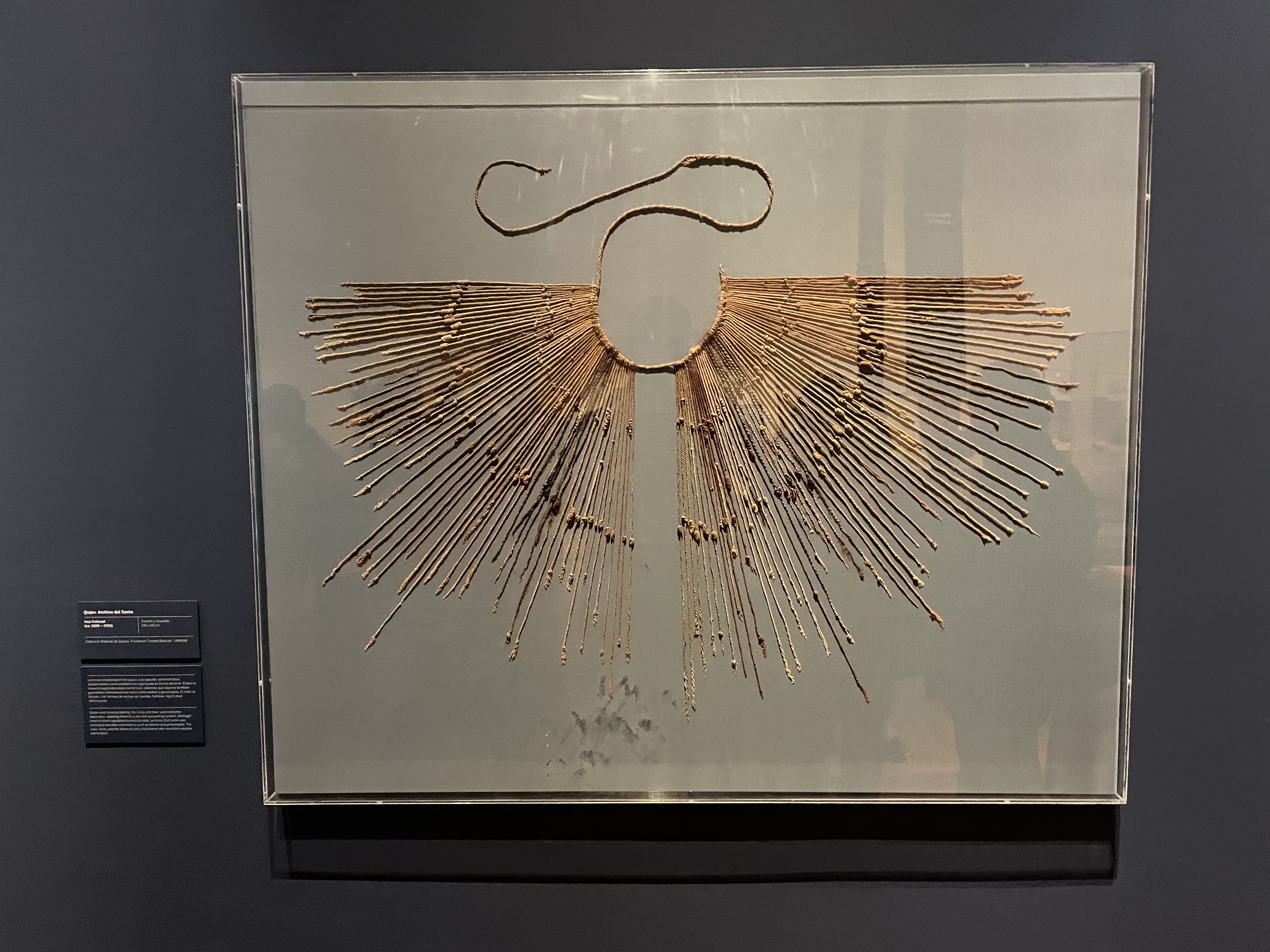
- One of the six Santa Valley Quipus on display in the Lima Art Museum.
- Material: Cotton
- Size: 106 cm × 65 cm (42 in × 26 in)
- Writing: Quipu
- Created: Colonial Period
- Discovered: Santa Valley, Peru
- Present location: Biblioteca Museo Temple Radicati, Lima

The Santa Valley Quipus are a group of six quipus (also spelled khipus)—Andean knotted cord recordkeeping devices—found in Peru’s Santa River valley. These quipus have drawn scholarly attention due to their possible correlation with a 1670 Spanish colonial census document from San Pedro de Corongo, as well as their stylistic similarity to earlier Inca quipus. Some researchers have dubbed them the "Rosetta quipus", likening them to the Rosetta Stone for their potential role in deciphering Andean knotted records.

== Description ==
The six quipus were reportedly found together in a single tomb in the Santa Valley, though their precise provenance is unknown. They were acquired and first studied by Carlos Radicati di Primeglio in the mid-20th century. Today, they are housed in the Biblioteca Museo Temple Radicati in Lima, Peru.

Each of the six quipus presents a consistent cord color patterning known as color-banding, a feature sometimes used to designate these as “banded khipus”. For this set of quipus, their color bands consist of six pendant cords each, resulting in 804 total cords organized into 133 six-cord groups. The combination of their shared structure and origin suggests that the six quipus form a unified archival set.

== Proposed link to the 1670 revisita ==
The potential link between the six quipus and a 1670 Spanish colonial revisita (revisit or census) was first proposed in 2011. The revisita lists 132 named tributaries divided among six pachacas (lineage groups roughly equivalent to ayllus) which closely mirrors the 133 color-banded six-cord groups in the quipus. Each differently colored group may represent one individual tributary. The total tribute amounts described in the census also appear to correspond with the summed knot values of the first cord in each six cord group on the quipus.

=== Moiety structure and cord attachments ===
A 2018 study suggested that the dual orientation of pendant cord attachments (either recto or verso) may encode moiety affiliation for each tributary, and its authors proposed a moiety alignment for the six lineage groups listed in the revisita. In 2024, further analysis identified a stronger alignment, proposing that verso attachments represent the upper (hanan) moiety and recto attachments the lower (hurin) moiety. Furthermore, the study noted that the order of the six lineage groups referenced in the census also appears to follow a bipartite and tripartite hierarchical structure consistent with known Andean social models.
