= Regional Museum of Ica "Adolfo Bermúdez Jenkins" =

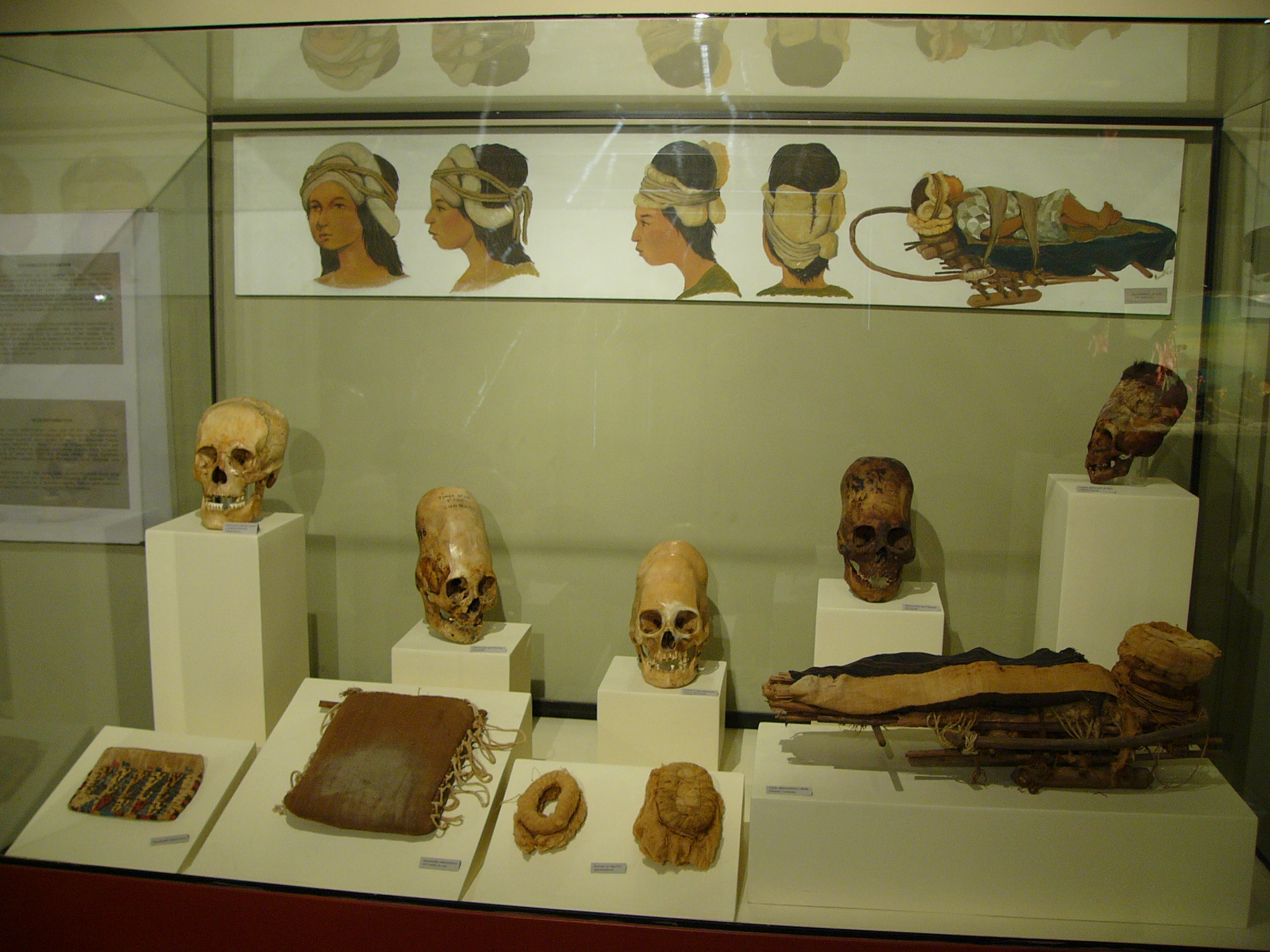
- Established: March 30, 1946; 78 years ago
- Location: Ica, Peru
- Coordinates: 14.072426°S 75.733925°W
- Type: Archaeological museum

The Regional Museum of Ica "Adolfo Bermudez Jenkins" (Spanish: Museo Regional de Ica "Adolfo Bermúdez Jenkins") is an archeological museum in Ica, Peru. The museum focuses mainly on the different indigenous cultures that inhabited Peru.

== History ==
The museum was founded with the help of Fernando León de Vivero, Alejandro Pezzia and Adolfo Bermúdez Jenkins in 1946. It is the first museum in Peru where paleontological studies of archeological remains of indigenous cultures were carried out. In 2011, the museum received mantles from the Paracas culture returned by the Swedish government. For a time the museum had to be closed in order to carry out some remodeling of the structure of the museum, financed by the Japan International Cooperation Agency and managed by the Peruvian Agency of International Cooperation. This was completed and the museum reopened in May 2016.

== Collections ==
The museum contains artifacts from various indigenous cultures of Peru, these are the Inca, Nazca, Chincha, Wari and Paracas. The museum includes Inca utensils, Paracas textiles, Nazca ceramics as well as a miniature model of the Nazca lines. The museum contains archaeological pieces such as ancient bones as well as a collection of huacos. The museum focuses mainly on the pre-Hispanic cultures of Peru but also contains exhibits from the colonial era and contemporary works of art. Among the exhibits on the colonial period is furniture from that period of Peruvian history. The museum contains about 26 thousand archaeological pieces belonging to different indigenous cultures of Peru. It also has musical instruments and quipus. The exhibits related to anthropology deal with trepanations and deformations of skull remains.

== Gallery ==
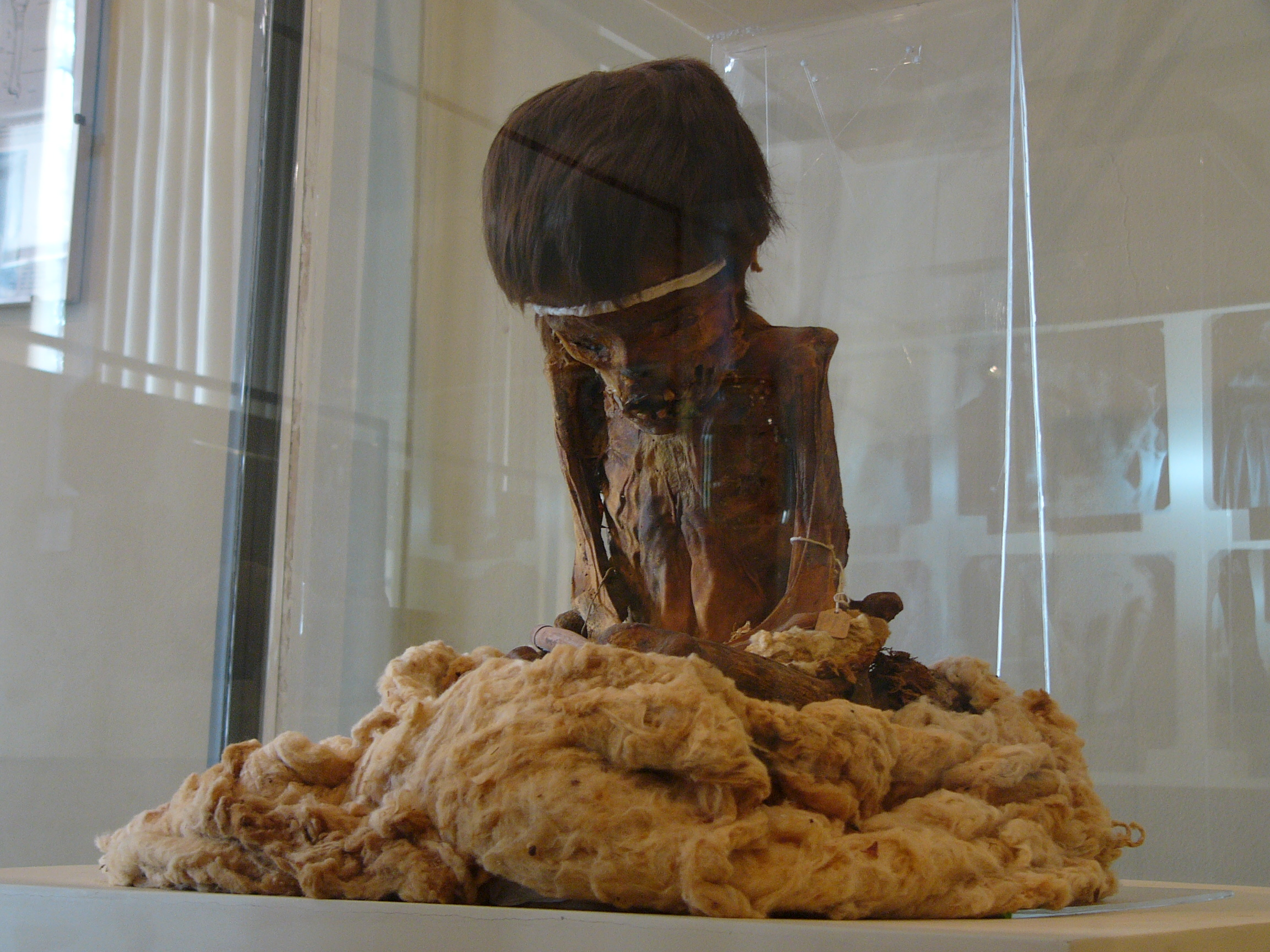

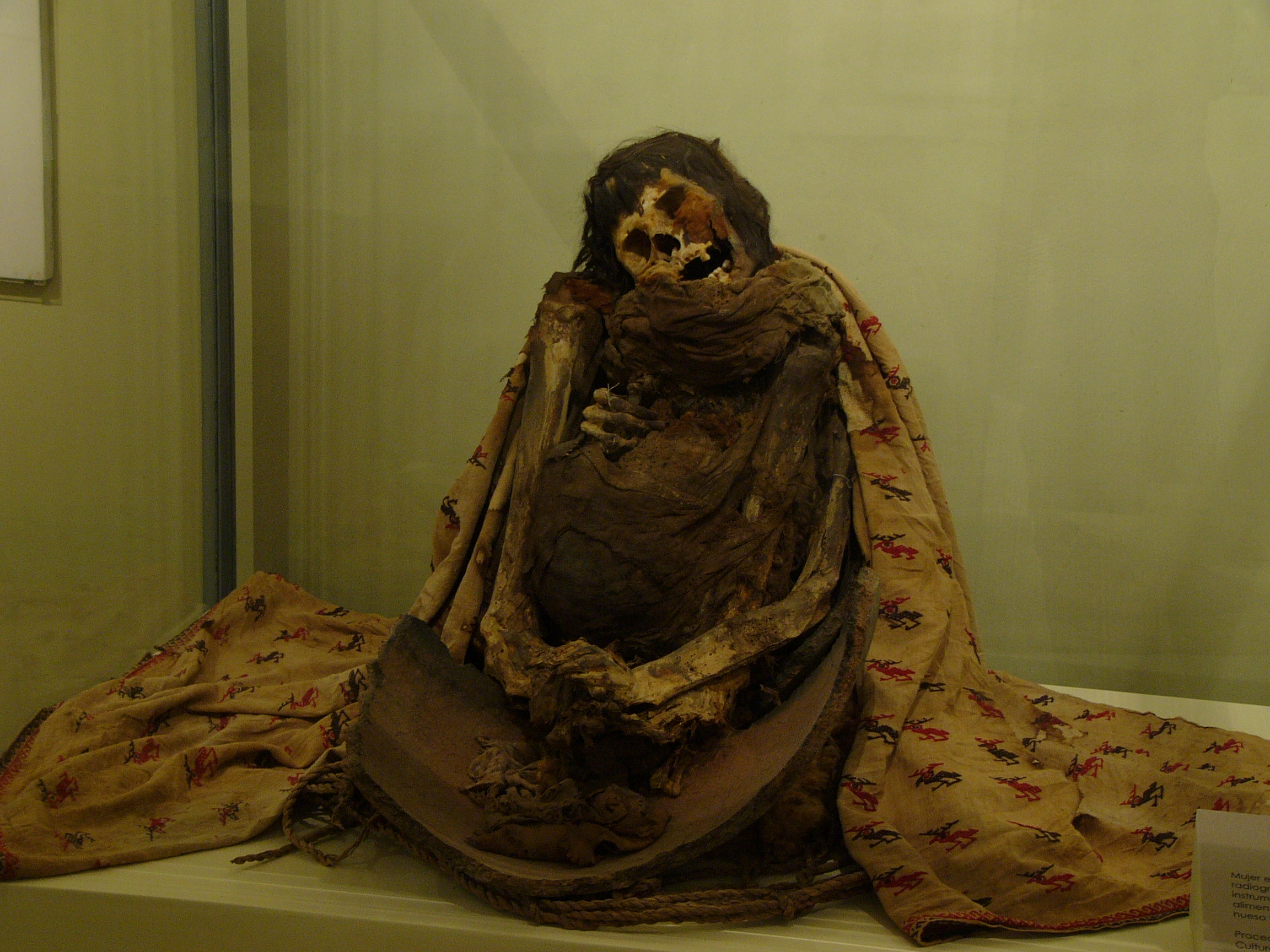

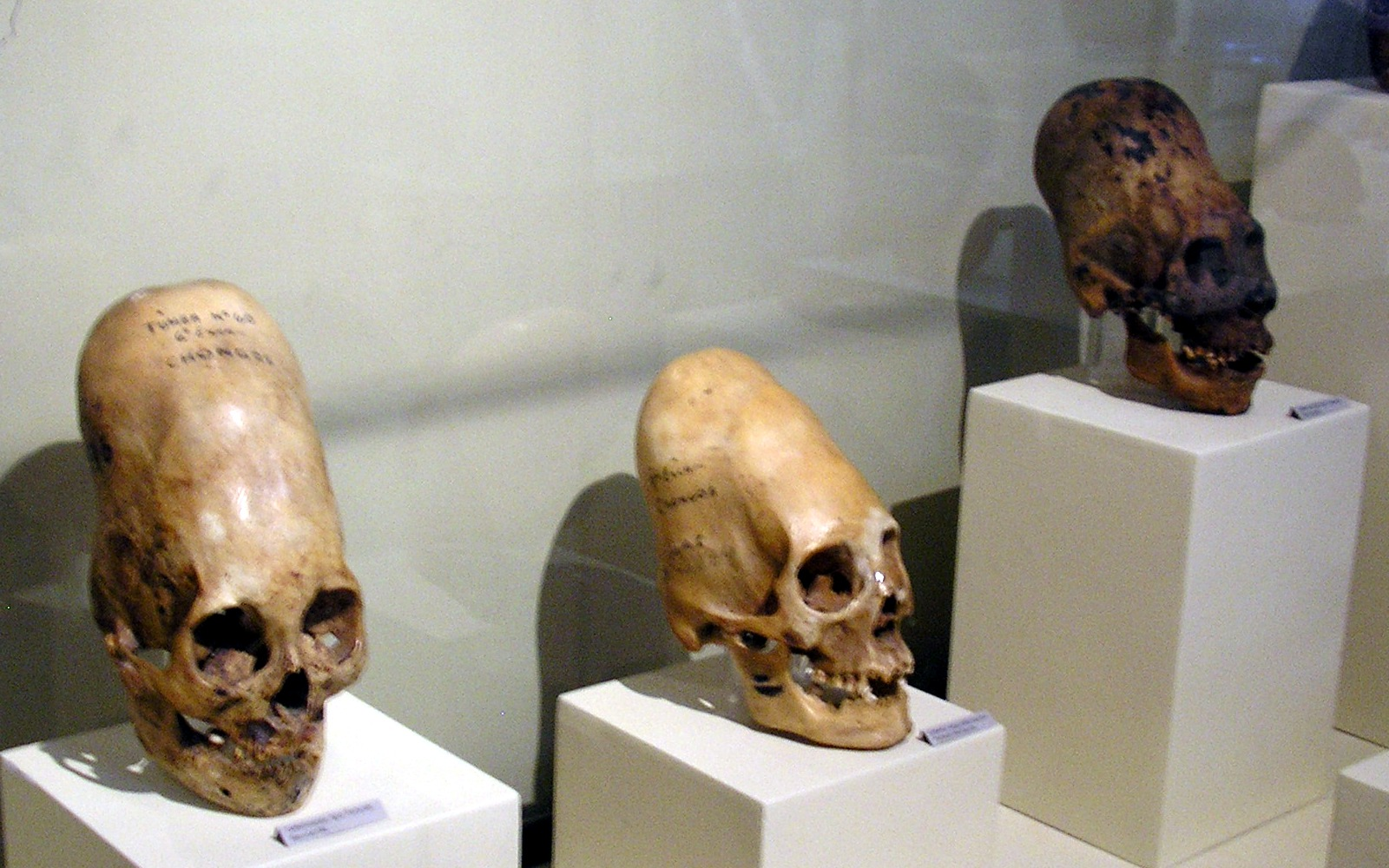
