= Quipu =

Andean record-keeping system using knotted cords

Quipu Khipu
- An Inca quipu, from the Larco Museum in Lima, Peru.
- Period: c. 2600 BCE – c. 1900 CE
- Region: Central Andes: Caral–Supe civilization; Paracas culture; Wari culture; Inca

Quipu in the Cleveland Museum of Art in Cleveland, Ohio.

Quipu (/ˈkiːpuː/ KEE-poo), also spelled khipu (Ayacucho Quechua: kipu, [ˈkipu]; Cusco Quechua: khipu, [kʰipu]), are record-keeping devices fashioned from knotted cords. They were historically used by various cultures in the central Andes of South America, most prominently by the Inca Empire.

A quipu usually consists of cotton or camelid fiber cords, and contains categorized information based on dimensions like color, order, and number. The Inca, in particular, used knots tied in a decimal positional system to store numbers and other values in quipu cords. Depending on use and the amount of information stored, quipus can have anywhere from a few to several thousand cords.

Objects which can unambiguously be identified as quipus first appear in the archaeological record during the 1st millennium CE, likely attributable to the Wari Empire. Quipus subsequently played a key part in the administration of the Kingdom of Cusco of the 13th to 15th centuries, and later of the Inca Empire (1438–1533), flourishing across the Andes from c. 1100 to 1532. Inca administration used quipus extensively for a variety of uses: monitoring tax obligations, collecting census records, keeping calendrical information, military organization, and potentially for recording simple and stereotyped historical "annales".

It is not known exactly how many intact quipus still remain, as many were deposited in ancient mausoleums or later destroyed by the Spanish. However, a recent survey of both museum and private collection inventories places the total number of known extant pre-Columbian quipus at just under 1,400.

After the Spanish conquest of the Inca Empire, quipus were slowly replaced by European writing and numeral systems. Many quipus were identified as idolatrous and destroyed, but some Spaniards promoted the adaptation of the quipu recording system to the needs of the colonial administration, and some priests advocated the use of quipus for ecclesiastical purposes. In some cases quipu technology was even fused with writing to form hybrid objects called quipu boards, which were often used to track religious duties. Today, quipus continue to serve as important items in several modern Andean villages.

Various other cultures have used knotted strings, unrelated to Andean quipus, to record information, such as Chinese knotting, also practiced by Tibetans, Japanese, and Polynesians.

== Etymology ==
The word quipu is derived from a Quechua word meaning 'knot'. The terms quipu and khipu are spelling variations on the same word. Quipu is the traditional spelling based on the Spanish orthography, while khipu reflects the Quechuan and Aymaran spelling shift. Khipu (pronounced [ˈkʰipu]) comes from Cusco Quechua, while many other Quechua varieties use the term kipu. The hispanicized spelling of quipu is the form most commonly used in both Spanish and English.

== Purpose ==
"The khipu were knotted-string devices that were used for recording both statistical and narrative information, most notably by the Inca but also by other peoples of the central Andes from pre-Incaic times, through the colonial and republican eras, and even – in a considerably transformed and attenuated form – down to the present day."

— Archaeologist Gary Urton, 2003.

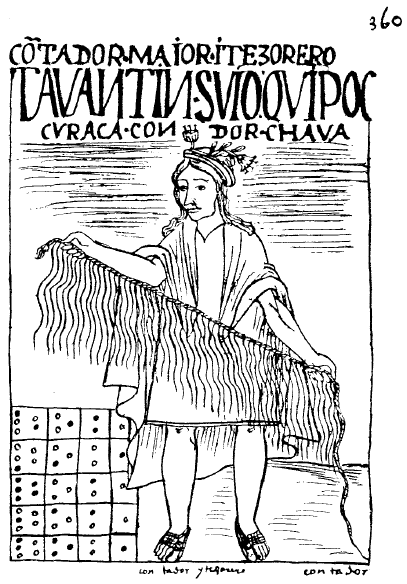
A quipucamayoc depicted in El primer nueva corónica y buen gobierno. A yupana, an Inca calculating device, is also visible in the lower left.

Quipus held information, decipherable by officials called quipucamayocs (Cusco Quechua: khipu kamayuq, lit. 'khipu specialist', [ˈkʰipu kaˈmajoχ]), classified in various categories, narrated from the most important to the least important category, according to color, number, and order.

To date, most of the information recorded on the quipus studied by researchers consists of numbers in a decimal system, such as "Indian chiefs ascertain[ing] which province had lost more than another and balanc[ing] the losses between them" after the Spanish invasion. In the early years of the Spanish conquest of Peru, Spanish officials often relied on the quipus to settle disputes over local tribute payments or goods production. The quipucamayocs could be summoned to court, where their bookkeeping was recognised as valid documentation of past payments.

Some knots — as well as other features, such as color, fiber type, cord attachments, etc. — are thought to compose an undeciphered non-numeric information system. The lack of a clear link between any indigenous Andean languages and the quipus has historically led to the supposition that quipus are not a glottographic writing system and have no phonetic referent. However, anthropologist Gary Urton has suggested that the quipus used a binary system that could record phonological or logographic data. According to Martti Pärssinen, quipucamayocs would learn specific oral texts, which in relation to the basic information contained in quipu, and pictorial representations, often painted on quiru vessels, similar to Aztec pictograms, related simple "episodes". Frank Salomon, meanwhile, has argued that quipus are actually a semasiographic language, a system of representative symbols – such as music notation or numerals – that relay information but are not directly related to the speech sounds of a particular language, like ideograms and proto-writing.

In 2011, a potential match between six colonial-era Santa Valley Quipus and a Spanish colonial document from the same region was identified. Researchers believe this possible quipu-document match is the strongest Rosetta Stone-like connection currently known, which could offer key clues needed to unlock the full extent of the quipu code. Subsequent studies have built on the proposed quipu-document connection, suggesting that the binary manner by which cords can be attached to the main body of the six quipus may encode moiety affiliation, and uncovering detailed Andean social structures encoded within the six quipus.

Sabine Hyland claims to have made the first phonetic decipherment through her analysis of epistolary quipus from San Juan de Collata, Peru, challenging the assumption that quipus do not represent information phonetically. However, the quipus in question date to the colonial period and are believed to have been exchanged during an 18th-century rebellion against the Spanish government, suggesting that their encoding may have been influenced by the introduction of European writing systems. With the help of local leaders, Hyland argues that the names of the two ayllus, or family lineages, who received and sent the quipus can be translated using phonetic references to the animal fibers and colors of the relevant quipu cords.

=== Numeric usage ===
While Spanish colonial chroniclers, such as Inca Garcilaso de la Vega, hinted at the numerical system of quipus, it is Leslie Leland Locke who is often credited with first demonstrating that many quipus encode numbers using a base-10 positional notation. Starting in the late 1960's and building on Locke's foundational work, Marcia Ascher and Robert Ascher analyzed several hundred quipus, revealing that most of the information recorded by quipu knots is numerical and can be systematically interpreted.

Most quipus use three main types of knots: simple overhand knots; "long knots", consisting of an overhand knot with one or more additional turns; and figure-eight knots. The Aschers also identified a fourth, and less common, type of knot—a figure-eight knot with an extra twist—which they refer to as an "EE" knot. On a given quipu cord, knots are grouped into clusters. Each cluster is tied at specific registers, or lengths, along the cord. These knot clusters represent digits in a base-10 number system. The units, or "ones" position is commonly tied at the bottom of a cord, followed by a space above it, then the "tens" position, then another space, then hundreds position, and so on. In other words:

- Powers of ten are denoted by position along the string, and this position is often aligned between successive strands.
- Digits in positions for 10 and higher powers are represented by clusters of simple knots (e.g., 40 is four simple knots in a row in the "tens" position).
- Digits 2–9 in the "ones" position are represented by long knots (e.g., 4 is a knot with four turns), and the digit 1 in the "ones" position is represented by a figure-eight knot.
- Zero is represented by the absence of a knot in the appropriate position.

For example, if 4s represents four simple knots, 3L represents a long knot with three turns, E represents a figure-eight knot, and X represents a space:

- The number 731 would be represented by 7s, 3s, E.
- The number 804 would be represented by 8s, X, 4L.
- The number 1493 would be represented by 1s, 4s, 9s, 3L.

Since the ones position on quipu cords are shown in a distinctive way (i.e., using long knots and figure-eight knots), it is usually clear where a number ends. Thus, it is possible that a single quipu cord could contain several numbers. For example:

- The number 107 followed by the number 51 would be represented by 1s, X, 7L, 5s, E.

The "reading" of quipu knots as numbers in the way outlined above is bolstered by the fact that quipus regularly contain sums in systematic ways. For instance, a cord may contain the sum of the next n cords, with this relationship being repeated throughout the quipu. In other cases, there are even cords which contain sums of sums. Such a relationship would be highly improbable if quipu knot values were being incorrectly interpreted.

Some data items are not numbers but what Ascher and Ascher call number labels. They are still composed of digits, but the resulting number seems to be used as a code. For example, Carrie J. Brezine hypothesized that a particular three-number label at the beginning of some quipus may refer to Puruchuco, similar to a ZIP code.

=== Non-numeric usage ===
Some have argued that far more than numeric information is present and that quipus are a writing system. This would be an especially important discovery as there is no surviving written record of the Inca Empire predating the Spanish invasion.

Making deciphering more complex, the Inca 'kept separate "khipu" for each province, on which a pendant string recorded the number of people belonging to each category.'

How exactly non-numeric information is encoded is disputed, though scholars are working to collect and analysis khipu data beyond just their knot values, exploring other variables—such as cord twist, color, fiber, attachment orientation, and knot variations—as signifiers of non-numerical data.

Historians Edward Hyams and George Ordish claim, for example, that quipus were recording devices, similar to musical notation, in that the notes on the page present basic information, and the performer would then bring those details to life.

A 2005 report in the journal Science, titled "Khipu Accounting in Ancient Peru", may represent the first identification of a quipu element for a non-numeric concept. The report details a sequence of three figure-eight knots at the start of a quipu that seems to be a unique signifier. It could be a toponym for the city of Puruchuco (near Lima), or the name of the quipu keeper who made it, or its subject matter, or even a time designator.

Quipucamayocs (knot makers/keepers, i.e., the Inca record keepers) supplied colonial administrators with a variety and quantity of information pertaining to censuses, tribute, ritual and calendrical organization, genealogies, and other such matters from Inca times. One study led by Alberto Sáez-Rodríguez discovered that the distribution and patterning of S- and Z-knots can organize the information system from a real star map of the Pleiades cluster.

Laura Minelli, a professor of pre-Columbian studies at the University of Bologna, has discovered something which she claims to be a seventeenth-century Jesuit manuscript that describes literary quipus, titled Historia et Rudimenta Linguae Piruanorum. This manuscript consists of nine folios with Spanish, Latin, and ciphered Italian texts. Owned by the family of Neapolitan historian Clara Miccinelli, the manuscript also includes a wool quipu fragment. Miccinelli claims that the text was written by two Italian Jesuit missionaries, Joan Antonio Cumis and Giovanni Anello Oliva, around 1610–1638, and Blas Valera, a mestizo Jesuit sometime before 1618. Along with the details of reading literary quipus, the documents also discuss the events and people of the Spanish conquest of Peru. According to Cumis, since so many quipus were burned by the Spanish, very few remained for him to analyze. As related in the manuscript, the word Pacha Kamaq, the Inca deity of earth and time, was used many times in these quipus, where the syllables were represented by symbols formed in the knots. Following the analysis of the use of "Pacha Kamaq", the manuscript offers a list of many words present in quipus. However, both Bruce Mannheim, the director of the Center for Latin American Studies at the University of Michigan, and Colgate University's Gary Urton, question its origin and authenticity. These documents seem to be inspired freely by a 1751 writing of Raimondo di Sangro, Prince of Sansevero.

== History ==
=== Possible proto-quipus ===
Claims of the earliest quipu, or possible proto-quipu, comes from the Late Preceramic (c. 3000–1800 BCE) site of Caral, though this claim has yet to be thoroughly evaluated. A more plausible candidate for the earliest known precursor to quipus may be the wrapped batons found at the site of Cerrillos from the Late Paracas Period (c. 350–200 BCE).

=== Wari Empire ===
The first undisputed evidence of quipu technology dates back to the Middle Horizon (c. 600–1000 CE), with these early quipus being used by the Wari Empire. Differing slightly from their Inca successors, extant Wari quipu specimens tend to be smaller, have brightly colored thread wrapped cords, and their own system of knots which scholars do not fully understand.

=== Inca Empire ===
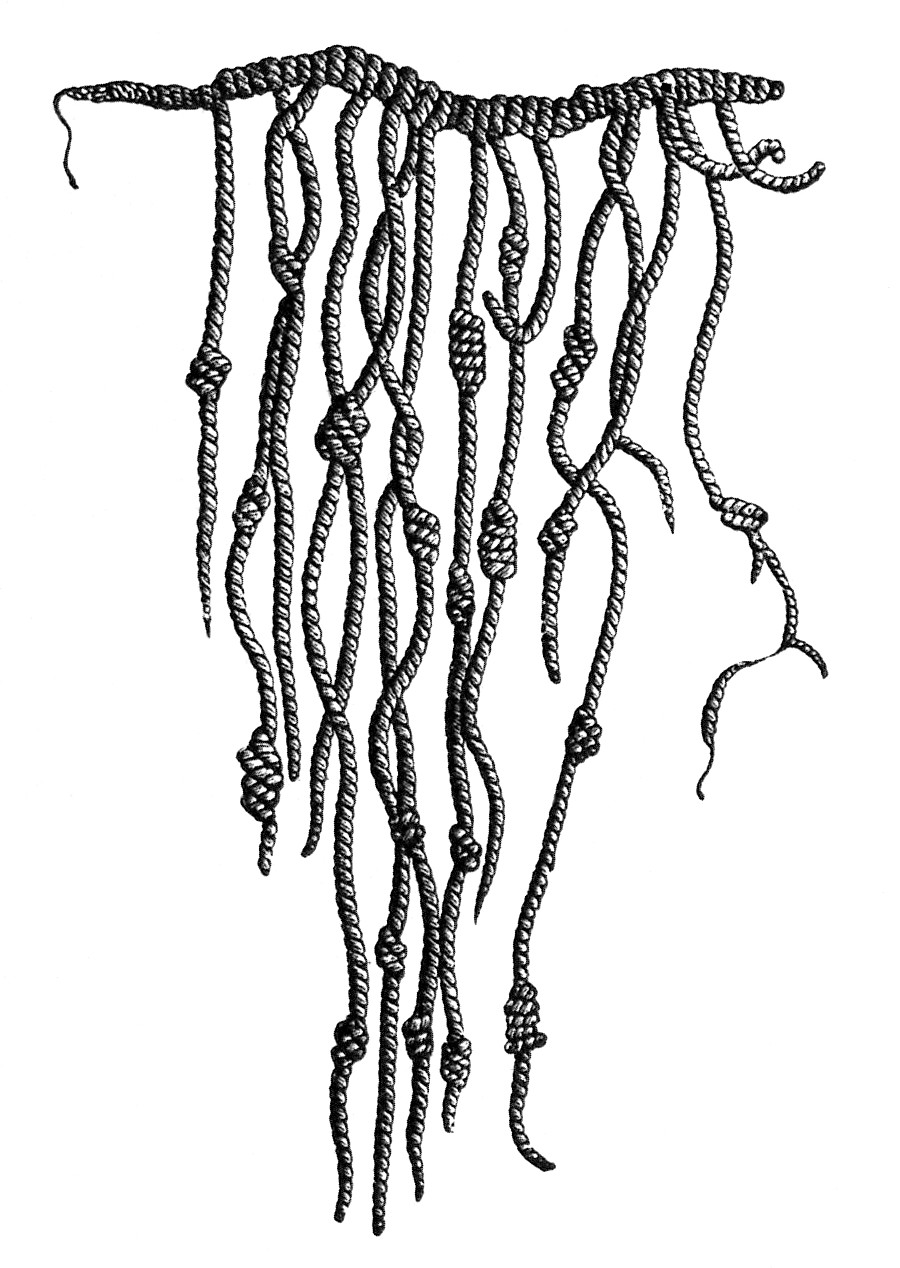
Representation of a quipu (1890)

Quipucamayocs (Quechua khipu kamayuq, "khipu-authority"), the accountants of Tawantin Suyu, created and deciphered the quipu knots. Quipucamayocs could carry out basic arithmetic operations, such as addition, subtraction, multiplication, and division. They kept track of mita, a form of taxation. The quipucamayocs also tracked the type of labor being performed, maintained a record of economic output, and ran a census that counted everyone from infants to "old blind men over 80". The system was also used to keep track of the calendar. According to Guaman Poma, quipucamayocs could "read" the quipus with their eyes closed.

Quipucamayocs were from a class of people, "males, fifty to sixty", and were not the only members of Inca society to use quipus. Inca historians used quipus when telling the Spanish about Tawantin Suyu history (whether they only recorded important numbers or actually contained the story itself is unknown). Members of the ruling class were usually taught to read quipus in the Inca equivalent of a university, the yachay wasi (literally, "house of teaching"), in the third year of schooling, for the higher classes who would eventually become the bureaucracy.

=== Spanish Empire ===
In 1532, the Spanish Empire's conquest of the Andean region began, with several Spanish conquerors making note of the existence of quipus in their written records about the invasion. The earliest known example comes from Hernando Pizarro, the brother of the Spanish military leader Francisco Pizarro, who recorded an encounter that he and his men had in 1533 as they traveled along the royal road from the highlands to the central coast. It was during this journey that they encountered several quipu keepers, later relating that these keepers "untied some of the knots which they had in the deposits section [of the khipu], and they [re-]tied them in another section [of the khipu]."

Christian officials of the Third Council of Lima banned and ordered the burning of some quipus in 1583 because they were used to record offerings to non-Christian gods and were therefore considered idolatrous objects and an obstacle to religious conversion.

=== Contemporary social importance ===
The quipu system operated as both a method of calculation and social organization, regulating regional governance and land use. While evidence for the latter is still under the critical eye of scholars around the world, the very fact that they are kept to this day without any confirmed level of fluent literacy in the system is testament to its historical 'moral authority.' Today, "khipu" is regarded as a powerful symbol of heritage, only 'unfurled' and handled by 'pairs of [contemporary] dignitaries,' as the system and its 'construction embed' modern 'cultural knowledge.' Ceremonies in which they are 'curated, even though they can no longer be read,' is even further support for the case of societal honor and significance associated with the quipu. Even today, 'the knotted cords must be present and displayed when village officers leave or begin service, and draping the cords over the incoming office holders instantiates the moral and political authority of the past.' These examples are indicative of how the quipu system was not only fundamental mathematically and linguistically for the original Inca, but also for cultural preservation of the original empire's descendants.

Anthropologists and archaeologists carrying out research in Peru have highlighted two known cases where quipus have continued to be used by contemporary communities, albeit as ritual items seen as "communal patrimony" rather than as devices for recording information. The quipu system, being the useful method of social management it was for the Inca, is also a link to the Cuzco census, as it was one of the primary methods of population calculation. This also has allowed historians and anthropologists to understand both the census and the "decimal hierarchy" system the Inca used, and that they were actually 'initiated together,' due to the fact that they were 'conceptually so closely linked.'

==== Tupicocha, Peru ====
In 1994, the American cultural anthropologist Frank Salomon conducted a study in the Peruvian village of Tupicocha, where quipus are still an important part of the social life of the village. As of 1994, this was the only known village where quipus with a structure similar to pre-Columbian quipus were still used for official local government record-keeping and functions, although the villagers did not associate their quipus with Inca artifacts.

==== San Cristóbal de Rapaz, Peru ====
The villagers of San Cristóbal de Rapaz (known as Rapacinos), located in the Province of Oyón, keep a quipu in an old ceremonial building, the Kaha Wayi, that is itself surrounded by a walled architectural complex. Also within the complex is a disused communal storehouse, known as the Pasa Qullqa, which was formerly used to protect and redistribute the local crops, and some Rapacinos believe that the quipu was once a record of this process of collecting and redistributing food. The entire complex was important to the villagers, being "the seat of traditional control over land use, and the centre of communication with the deified mountains who control weather".

In 2004, the archaeologist Renata Peeters (of the UCL Institute of Archaeology in London) and the cultural anthropologist Frank Salomon (of the University of Wisconsin) undertook a project to conserve both the quipus in Rapaz and the building that it was in, due to their increasingly poor condition.

==== Jucul, Peru ====
The remote village of Jucul, Peru, has kept quipus in the attic of its colonial church for centuries, only recently being discovered by outsiders in 2024. These quipus are closely related to those of San Cristóbal de Rapaz, which is near by.

== Collections and number of quipus ==
The total number of quipus is unknown. Their whereabouts range from Europe to North and South America. Most are housed in museums outside of their native countries, but some reside in their native locations under the care of the descendants of those who made the knot records.

The archaeologist Gary Urton noted in his 2003 book Signs of the Inka Khipu that he estimated "from my own studies and from the published works of other scholars that there are about 600 extant quipu in public and private collections around the world."

The Khipu Database Project was started by Urton and Carrie Brezine with funding from Harvard University and the National Science Foundation with the aim of centralizing data about known quipus. The project later became the Open Khipu Repository, which introduced a new "KH" numbering system to distinguish between quipus, moving away from naming systems based on archaeologists' names. As of January 2026, the Open Khipu Repository records 702 quipus with publicly available data.

A 2021 survey of both museum and private collection inventories places the total number of known extant pre-Columbian quipus at just under 1,400.

Institutional quipu collections
Collection	Location	Quipus
Ethnological Museum of Berlin	Berlin, Germany	298
Museum Five Continents	Munich, Germany	??
Pachacamac	near Lima, Peru	35
Museo Nacional de Arqueología, Antropología e Historia del Perú	Lima, Peru	35
Centro Mallqui	Leimebamba, Amazonas, Peru	32
Museo Temple Radicati, National University of San Marcos	Lima, Peru	26
Regional Museum of Ica "Adolfo Bermúdez Jenkins"	Ica, Peru	25
Museo Puruchuco	Ate District, Lima, Peru	23

== Preservation ==
Quipus are made of fibers, either spun and plied thread such as wool or hair from alpaca, llama, guanaco or vicuña, though are also commonly made of cellulose like cotton. Archaeological evidence has also shown that, in some cases, finely carved wood was used as a supplemental base to which the color-coded cords could be attached. The knotted strings of quipus were often made with an "elaborate system of knotted cords, dyed in various colors, the significance of which was known to the magistrates". Fading of color, natural or dyed, cannot be reversed, and may indicate further damage to the fibers. Colors can darken if damaged by dust or by certain dyes and mordants. Quipus have been found with adornments, such as dried potatoes and beans, attached to the cords, and these non-textile materials may require additional preservation measures.

Quipus are now preserved using techniques that aim to minimize their future degradation. Museums, archives and special collections have adopted preservation guidelines from textile practices.

Environmental controls are used to monitor and control temperature, humidity and light exposure of storage areas. As with all textiles, cool, clean, dry and dark environments are most suitable. The heating, ventilating and air conditioning, or HVAC systems, of buildings that house quipu knot records are usually automatically regulated. Relative humidity should be 60% or lower, with low temperatures, as high temperatures can damage the fibres and make them brittle. Damp conditions and high humidity can damage protein-rich material. Textiles suffer damage from ultraviolet (UV) light, which can include fading and weakening of the fibrous material. When quipus are on display, their exposure to ambient conditions is usually minimized and closely monitored.

Despite best efforts, damage can occur during storage, or be from the result of earlier conservation efforts. The more accessible the items are during storage, the greater the chance of early detection. Storing quipus horizontally on boards covered with a neutral pH paper (paper that is neither acid or alkaline) to prevent potential acid transfer is a preservation technique that extends the life of a collection. The fibers can be abraded by rubbing against each other or, for those attached to sticks or rods, by their own weight if held in an upright position. Extensive handling of quipus can also increase the risk of further damage.

Quipus are also closely monitored for mold, as well as insects and their larvae. As with all textiles, these are major problems. Fumigation may not be recommended for fiber textiles displaying mold or insect infestations, although it is common practice for ridding paper of mold and insects.

Conservators in the field of library science have the skills to handle a variety of situations. Even though some quipus have hundreds of cords, each cord should be assessed and treated individually. Quipu cords can be "mechanically cleaned with brushes, small tools and light vacuuming". Just as the application of fungicides is not recommended to rid quipus of mold, neither is the use of solvents to clean them.

Even when people have tried to preserve quipus, corrective care may still be required. If quipus are to be conserved close to their place of origin, local camelid or wool fibres in natural colors can be obtained and used to mend breaks and splits in the cords. Rosa Choque Gonzales and Rosalia Choque Gonzales, conservators from southern Peru, worked to conserve the Rapaz patrimonial quipus in the Andean village of Rapaz, Peru. These quipus had undergone repair in the past, so this conservator team used new local camelid and wool fibers to spin around the area under repair in a similar fashion to the earlier repairs found on the quipu.

When Gary Urton, professor of Anthropology at Harvard, was asked "Are they [quipus] fragile?", he answered, "some of them are, and you can't touch them – they would break or turn into dust. Many are quite well preserved, and you can actually study them without doing them any harm. Of course, any time you touch an ancient fabric like that, you're doing some damage, but these strings are generally quite durable."

Ruth Shady, a Peruvian archeologist, has discovered what she argues resembles a proto-quipu dating to approximately 5,000 years old in the coastal city of Caral. It was in quite good condition, with "brown cotton strings wound around thin sticks", along with "a series of offerings, including mysterious fiber balls of different sizes wrapped in 'nets' and pristine reed baskets. Piles of raw cotton – uncombed and containing seeds, though turned a dirty brown by the ages – and a ball of cotton thread" were also found preserved. The good condition of these articles can be attributed to the arid climate of Caral.

== In popular culture ==
=== Film and television ===
- Kamen Rider Amazon (1974): In Episode 6, Amazon and friends investigate and find a quipu which Amazon could decipher. But the Porcupine Beastman arrives and steals the quipu. The Mole Beastman retrieves the quipu for Amazon who learns of the Incan science rested on the GiGi and GaGa Armlets.
- The Mysterious Cities of Gold (1982): As the daughter of an Inca priest, Zia can read and create quipu and is depicted doing so in several episodes.
- Earth: Final Conflict (1999): A quipu and the Nazca Lines play a role in the plot of Season 3, Episode 5.
- Da Vinci's Demons (2014): In Season 3, Episode 5, Leonardo and his associates are captured by an Inca patrol, who are given updated orders recorded on a quipu.
- Teekyu (2015): In Season 4, Marimo uses a quipu to subdue Tomarin in a comedic sequence.
- Dora and the Lost City of Gold (2019): Dora "reads" a stone quipu by touch to uncover a treasure's location.
- See (2019-2022): Characters in the series, who are blind, use knotted strings for communication.
- Futurama (2024): In Season 12, Episode 1, Bender returns to his country of origin, Mexico, where he receives a quipu from his grandmother.
- Paddington in Peru (2024): A message is recorded in a quipu to provide directions to El Dorado.
- Dora and the Search for Sol Dorado (2025): Dora and Diego interpret quipus throughout their adventures.
- Jeopardy! (2026): "What is a quipu?" was featured as the $2,000 question in the Double Jeopardy round under the category “ARE YOU KNOT ENTERTAINED?” on February 17, 2026.

=== Literature ===
- The Wine-Dark Sea by Patrick O’Brian: A quipu conveys an important message in Chapter 9.
- The Rise and Fall of D.O.D.O. by Neal Stephenson and Nicole Galland: Quipus are used by witches for navigating time travel algorithms.
- This Is How You Lose the Time War by Amal El-Mohtar and Max Gladstone: A letter from "Blue" is hidden in pre-Columbian Peru as a "knot code."
- Ammonite by Nicola Griffith: Knotted message cords, read by touch, facilitate communication across distances.
- Catalina by Karla Cornejo Villavicencio: Researchers work to decode Andean quipus in a subplot.
- The Bedlam Stacks by Natasha Pulley: Quipus are used by various Quechua characters and one non-Quechua character to leave messages for one another.

=== Games ===
- Death Stranding: The character Amelie wears a quipu necklace, and a device inspired by the quipu—the Q-Pid—is featured.
- Magic: The Gathering: The expansion set The Lost Caverns of Ixalan includes a card named "Braided Quipu," transforming from "Braided Net."
- Catan - Rise of the Inkas: Quipu imagery is used in the visual design to evoke Inka administration, though quipus do not function as a distinct gameplay mechanic.
