= Leslie Leland Locke =

American mathematician and educator, known for work on deciphering ancient Andean quipus

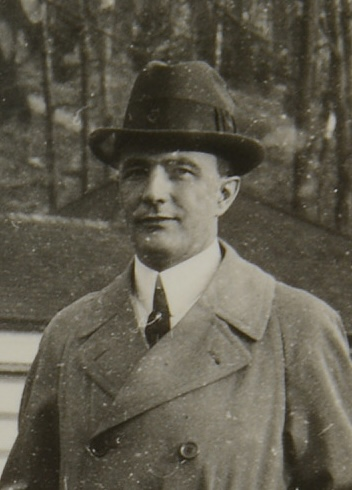
- Locke circa 1920
- Born: 1875; Grove City, Pennsylvania
- Died: August 28, 1943 (aged 67–68); Brooklyn, New York
- Known for: Decipherment work on the Inca Quipu
- Spouse(s): Alberta Palmer Locke, 2nd marriage
- Children: Dorothy Brown Locke

Academic background
- Education: Grove City College (B.A., 1892–1896); Grove City College (M.A., 1896–1900); Pennsylvania State University; Cornell University; Teachers College at Columbia University

Academic work
- Discipline: Mathematics; History of mathematics

Leslie Leland Locke (1875–1943) was an American mathematician, historian, and educator, best known for his work towards deciphering ancient Andean knot records called quipus.

Locke's most prominent work, The Ancient Quipu or Peruvian Knot Record (1923), demonstrated how the Inca tied knots on quipu cords using a base-10 positional number system. In addition to his work on quipus, Locke is also recognized for his research on the history of mathematics and mathematical instruments, particularly his research and collection of calculating machines.

== Education ==
Locke earned both his B.A. (1896) and M.A. (1900) from Grove City College. He went on to study mathematics at Pennsylvania State University; Cornell University; and eventually at Teachers College at Columbia University, where he studied under Professor David Eugene Smith. As a graduate student studying the history of mathematics, Locke assisted Smith and Yoshio Mikami with their 1914 book, The History of Japanese Mathematics, by taking the many photographs used throughout the book.

== Career ==
Early in his career, Locke held several short-term teaching positions, including at West Sunbury Academy in West Sunbury, Pennsylvania; a high school in Fredonia, Pennsylvania; and at Michigan State University in East Lansing, Michigan. In 1902, he moved to Brooklyn, New York, where he began teaching at Adelphi College, a position he held for six years. In 1906, he transitioned to the Maxwell Training School for Teachers, also in Brooklyn.

In 1933, Locke joined Brooklyn Technical High School as a mechanical drawing instructor, a role he held until his retirement in 1942. Concurrently, from 1917 to 1938, he served as a professor of mathematics, teaching evening sessions at Brooklyn College.

Aside from teaching, Locke authored several scientific publications (see section on selected publications), often writing under the abbreviated name "L. Leland Locke." He was a "Foundation Member" of the History of Science Society (HSS) and served as the society's Secretary at one point. Additionally, he was a member of several other academic organizations, including the American Mathematics Society (AMS), the National Council of Teachers of Mathematics (NCTM), and the Mathematics Association of America (MAA).

=== Quipu research ===
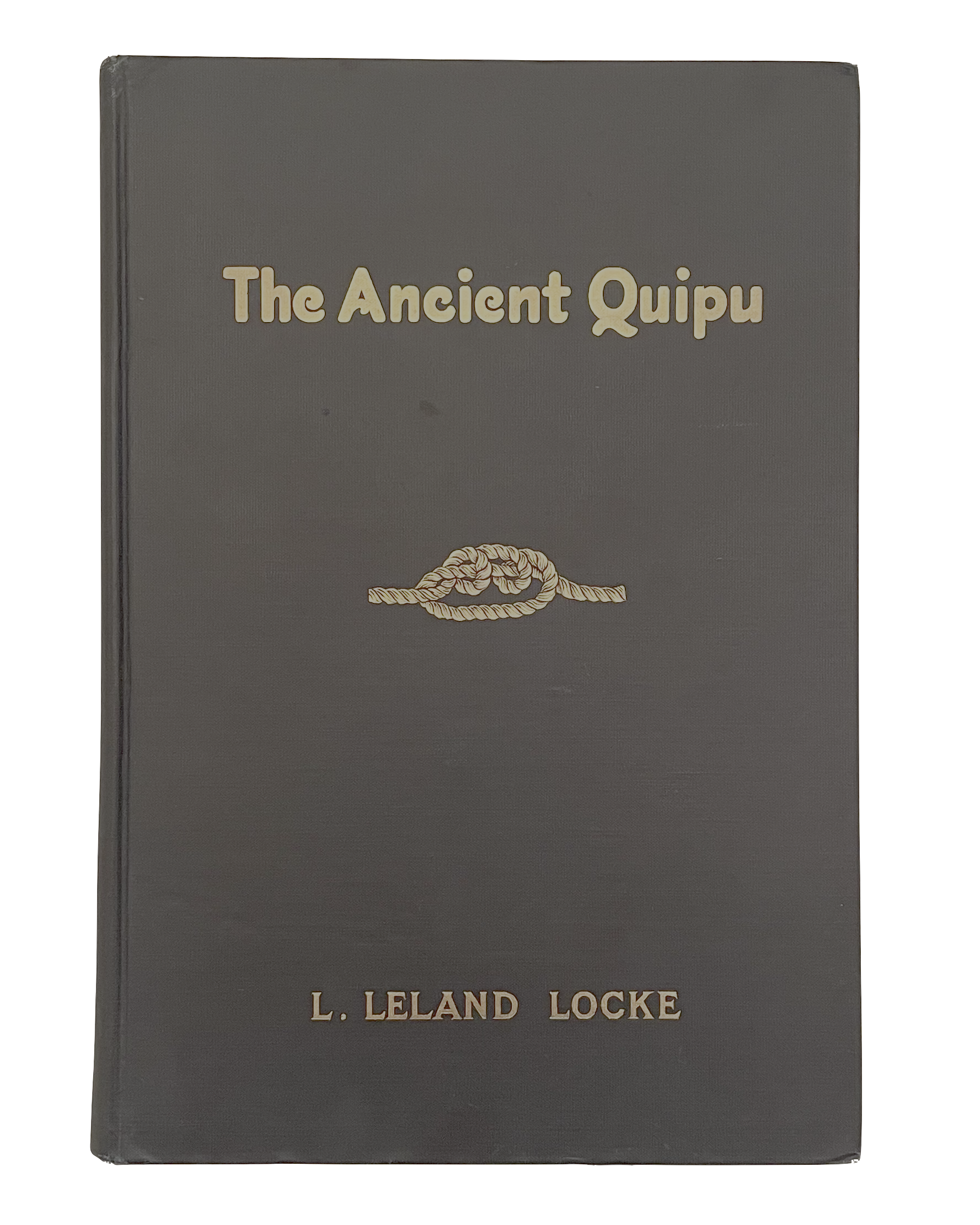
Cover of The Ancient Quipu (1923) by Leslie Leland Locke.

Under the guidance of Professor David Eugene Smith, Locke began studying Andean quipus, drawing on Smith's extensive collection of rare books on South America and his access to specimens housed at the American Museum of Natural History. Notably, an accession card for quipu B/8715 in the museum's collection indicates that the specimen was lent to Smith in November 1911, likely for Locke's research.

Locke's first major work on the Andean quipu was published in 1912 as an article in American Anthropologist, titled "The Ancient Quipu, a Peruvian Knot Record". In this seminal work, Locke outlined a basic working model for how Inca quipus recorded numbers using three types of knots: the overhand knot, the figure-eight knot, and eight types of long knots. He showed that a knot's distance from the quipu's main cord was used to denote its value in a decimal system. He argued that quipus were not used directly for counting or calculating—e.g., an abacus—but rather solely to record information. Finally, he strongly believed quipu knots were used purely for numerical purposes.

Locke later expanded his initial 1912 article into a full-length book, publishing The Ancient Quipu or Peruvian Knot Record through the American Museum of Natural History in 1923. Early reviews hailed the book as "the first serious attempt to elucidate the quipu mystery" and noted that "the conclusions reached by Professor Locke are very important." In the preface to one of his own works on quipus, Erland Nordenskiöld—a leading expert in South American archaeology and anthropology of the early 20th century—praised Locke as "the founder of the modern study of the quipu".

=== Calculating machines ===
After his work on quipus, Locke became interested in the history of the calculating machine. He soon became an avid collector of these devices and amassed a collection of well over 100 items, at least one of which was thought to have been the first of its kind. Several of the more rare pieces in Locke's collection included:

- The first direct multiplication machine (designed by Ramon Verea in 1878)
- A lever-set barrel calculating machine (patented by George B. Grant in 1887)
- A cylindrical slide rule (invented by George Fuller in 1878)

In 1939, Locke donated his large collection to the Smithsonian Institution. According to the Smithsonian, Locke had initially intended his collection to go to the Museums of the Peaceful Arts in New York, but the museum closed before he could do so.

=== Personal Library ===
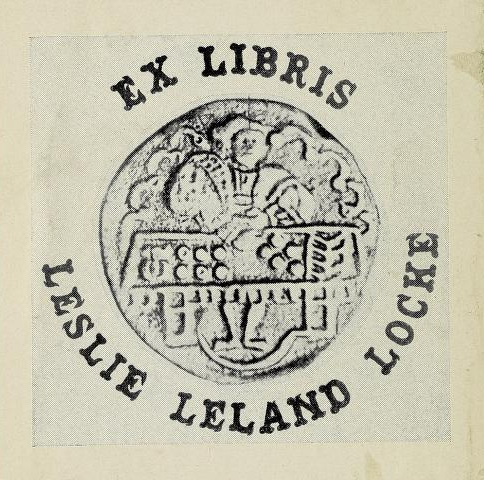
Bookplate from Locke's personal library.

Over the course of his life, Locke amassed an extensive personal library reflecting his interests in mathematics and other topics. Many of the books in Locke's collection featured a personalized bookplate with a circular design surrounded by the text "EX LIBRIS" at the top and "LESLIE LELAND LOCKE" at the bottom, meaning "From the library of Leslie Leland Locke." The central image depicts a figure, possibly seated or standing, engaged in scholarly or artistic activity, with a detailed rectangular object below that may represent a table, altar, or chest.

Locke's collection included notable mathematical works such as:

- Numerorum Mysteria (1591) by Pietro Bongo.
- Barlow’s Tables of Squares, Cubes, Square Roots, Cube Roots, Reciprocals of All Integer Numbers up to 10,000 (1840) by Peter Barlow.
- Mathematical Tables, Automatic Arithmetic: A New System for Multiplication and Division Without Mental Labour and Without the Use of Logarithms (1878) by John Sawyer.

"Locke collected mathematical books and calculating machines. He wrote extensively on such instruments. Moreover, he graded and collected the paper-and-pencil standardized tests then relatively new in mathematics education. Many of these materials survive at the Smithsonian, offering a window into both the history of mathematics and the history of pedagogy at that time and place."

— Peggy A. Kidwell (Historian of Science), American Mathematical Society

Along with his books, Locke collected various copies of tests and examinations, including (but not limited to) a test for a fifth-grade algebra class, college entrance examinations, and New York Training School certificate examinations. He also preserved lecture notes from his time as both a student and a mathematics teacher, providing insight into early 20th-century educational practices.

Locke's library also revealed his other interests beyond mathematics. Among these were Tricks With Cards (1893) by Professor Hoffmann, a book on sleight of hand card tricks, and On the Economy of Machinery and Manufactures (1832) by Charles Babbage, a treatise on industrial efficiency and the application of scientific principles to manufacturing.

Following his death, Locke left his collection of books on mathematics to his alma mater, Grove City College. However, one source also notes that Locke donated "valuable early American text-books" to the University of Michigan during his lifetime. The collection given to Grove City College was later donated by the college to the Smithsonian Libraries and Archives.

== Death ==
Locke died at his home at 950 St. John's Place in Brooklyn, New York, on August 28, 1943. Some sources describe his death as sudden, while others report that he died "after a long illness".

== Selected publications ==
- Locke, L. Leland. 1909. "Pure Mathematics." The Science-History of the Universe, 8:1–187. New York: Current Literature Publishing Company.
- Locke, L. Leland. 1912. "The Ancient Quipu, a Peruvian Knot Record." American Anthropologist 14 (2): 325–32.
- Locke, L. Leland. 1923. The Ancient Quipu or Peruvian Knot Record. American Museum of Natural History.
- Locke, L. Leland. 1924. "The History of Modern Calculating Machines, An American Contribution." The American Mathematical Monthly 31 (9): 422–29.
- Locke, L. Leland. 1924. "Mathematics of the Calculating Machine." The Mathematics Teacher 17 (2):78-86.
- Locke, L. Leland. 1926. "The First Direct-Multiplication Machine." Typewriter Topics, November:16-18.
- Locke, L. Leland. 1927. "A Peruvian Quipu." In Contributions from the Museum of the American Indian, Heye Foundation, 7:3–11. New York: Museum of the American Indian, Heye Foundation.
- Locke, L. Leland. 1928. "Supplementary Notes on the Quipus in the American Museum of Natural History." Anthropological Papers of the American Museum of Natural History 30 (3): 43–73.
