= Gary Urton =

American anthropologist

- Born: July 7, 1946 (age 80); Clovis, New Mexico
- Awards: MacArthur Fellowship; Guggenheim Fellowship

Academic background
- Education: Eastern New Mexico University (1964–1966); University of New Mexico (BA, 1966–1969); University of Illinois (MA, 1969–1971); University of Illinois (PhD, 1971–1979)

Academic work
- Discipline: Anthropology; Archaeology
- Sub-discipline: Pre-Columbian studies; Andean archaeology
- Institutions: Colgate University (1978–2002); Harvard University (2002–2020)

Gary Urton (born July 7, 1946) is an American anthropologist. He was the Dumbarton Oaks Professor of Pre-Columbian Studies at Harvard University and the chair of its anthropology department between 2012 and 2019. Urton retired from Harvard in 2020, after multiple former students accused him of sexual harassment. Despite much controversy and opposition, he was given an emeritus title after retirement. Following internal investigation, Urton was stripped of his emeritus status by Harvard in June 2021.

== Education and career ==
Urton received his B.A. from the University of New Mexico in 1969, and his M.A. and Ph.D. degrees from the University of Illinois Urbana-Champaign in 1971 and 1979, respectively. He was a professor at Colgate University from 1978 to 2002. He is married to artist and anthropologist Julia Meyerson.

Urton is a specialist in Andean archaeology, particularly the quipu (khipu) rope-based recording system used in the Inca empire in the 15th and 16th centuries. He is one of the most prominent advocates of the theory that the quipus encode linguistic as well as numerical information. He is a class of 2000 MacArthur Fellow.

== Sexual harassment allegations ==
According to an investigation by The Harvard Crimson, Urton was the subject of a sexual harassment complaint from a former student in 2016. The student alleged that Urton "pressured her into 'unwelcome sex'" in exchange for a recommendation letter. Urton responded that the allegations were "either untrue, inaccurate, or misleading". More allegations emerged following the publication of the investigation. UC-San Diego professor Jade d'Alpoim Guedes alleged that Urton had inappropriately propositioned her for sex while she was a graduate student at Harvard. It was also alleged that Urton harassed students at his field school in San Jose de Moro, and the anthropology department received further complaints that were not made public. After 25 faculty members and nearly 400 students signed letters calling for his resignation, Urton retired from Harvard in July 2020. In June 2021, the Harvard Office for Dispute Resolution concluded that Urton had engaged in unwelcome sexual conduct and abused power with individuals over whom he had professional responsibility. In response to these findings Urton was stripped of his emeritus status, and was banned from engaging with the Harvard community.

The allegations against Urton surfaced amidst reports of a general culture of sexual harassment and gender discrimination at Harvard's anthropology department. In June 2020, over fifty former students and faculty signed a letter complaining that under Urton's leadership, the department was an "old boys’ club" that fostered "an environment that tolerated gender-based harassment, [...] sexual misconduct, sexism, and misogyny." In 2015, while Urton was the chair of the department, a Title IX gender discrimination lawsuit was brought against it by former professor Kimberly Theidon. The lawsuit primarily concerned multiple allegations of sexual harassment against Urton's colleague Theodore C. Bestor, but also included the accusation that Urton had protected Bestor and "intentionally sabotaged" Theidon's application for tenure because of her advocacy for students who experienced sexual harassment.

== Selected publications ==
- Inka History in Knots: Reading Khipus as Primary Sources. Austin, TX: University of Texas Press, 2017.
- The Khipus of Laguna de los Condores/Los Khipus de la Laguna de los Cóndores. Lima, Peru: Forma e Imagen 2008.
- Signs of the Inka Khipu: Binary Coding in the Andean Knotted-String Records. Austin, TX: University of Texas Press, 2003. Spanish edition: Signos del Khipu Inka: Código Binario. Cusco, Peru: Centro Bartolomé de las Casas, 2005.
- Inca Myths. London: British Museum Press and Austin, TX: Press, 1999. (Translated into Spanish, German, Russian, Korean, Polish, Japanese, Chinese, Greek, and French).
- The Social Life of Numbers: A Quechua Ontology of Numbers and Philosophy of Arithmetic. Austin, TX: University of Texas Press, 1997. Spanish edition: La Vida Social de los Numeros: Una Ontologia de los Números y la Filosofía de la Aritmética Quechuas. Cusco, Peru: Centro Bartolomé de las Casas, 2003.
- The History of a Myth: Pacariqtambo and the Origin of the Inkas. Austin, TX: University of Texas Press, 1990. Spanish edition: Historia de un Mito: Pacariqtambo y el Origen de los Inkas. Cusco, Peru: Centro Bartolomé de las Casas, 2004.
- At the Crossroads of the Earth and the Sky: An Andean Cosmology. Latin American Monographs, no. 55, 1981. paperback edition, 1988. Spanish edition: En el Cruce de Rumbos de las Tierra y el Cielo. Cusco, Peru: Centro Bartolomé de las Casas, 2004.
