= Ica, Peru =

City in the Department of Ica, Peru

Ica
- City
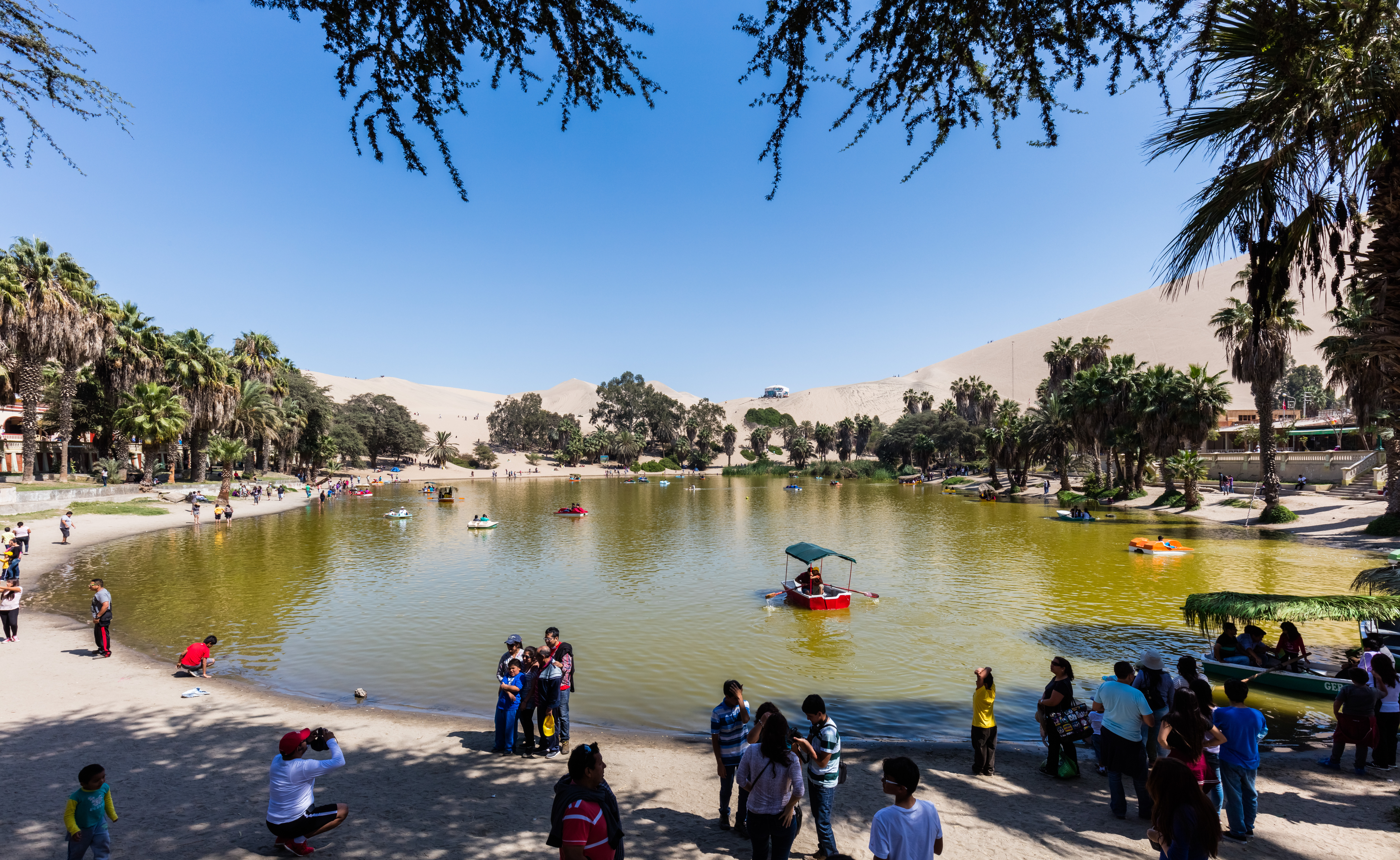
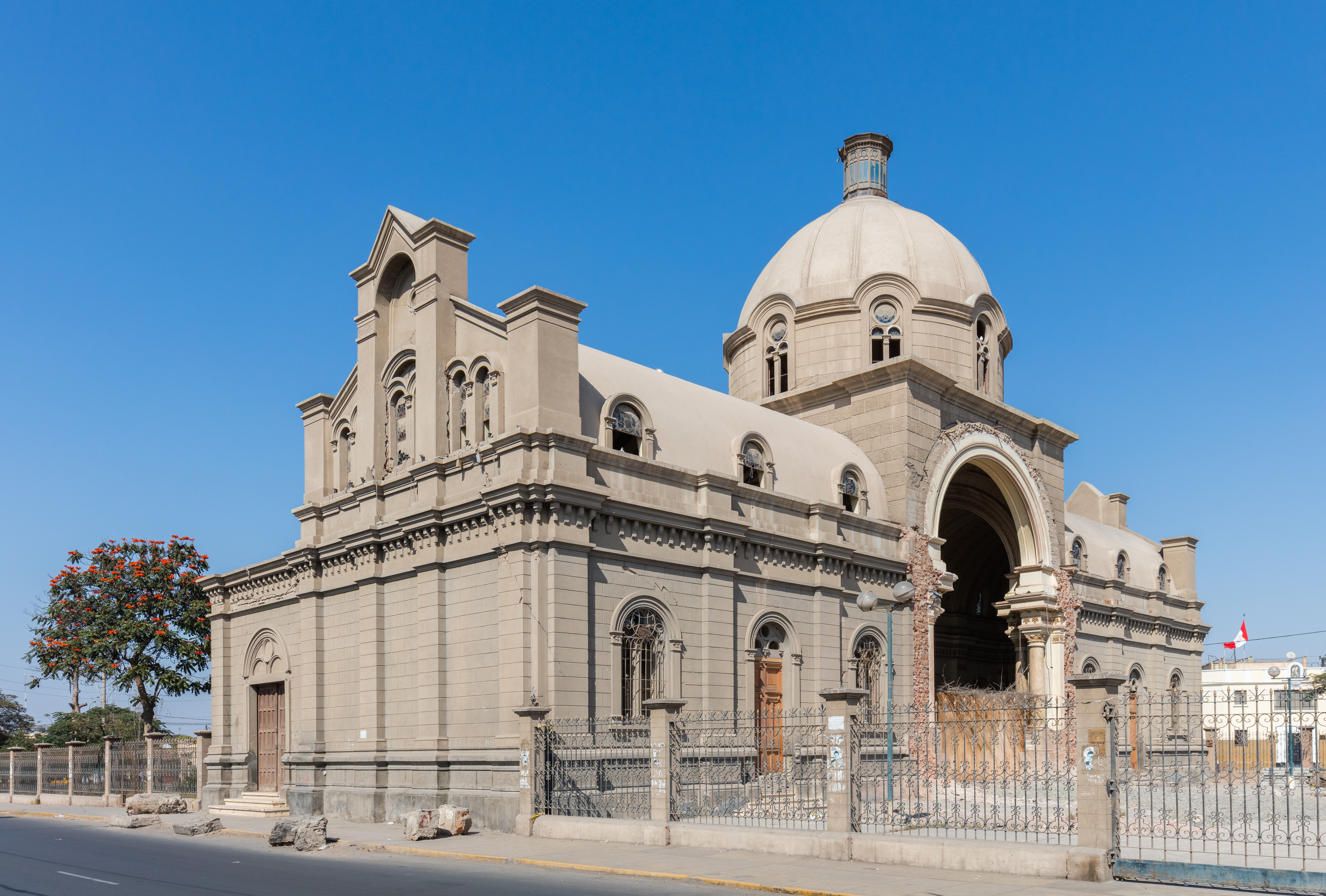
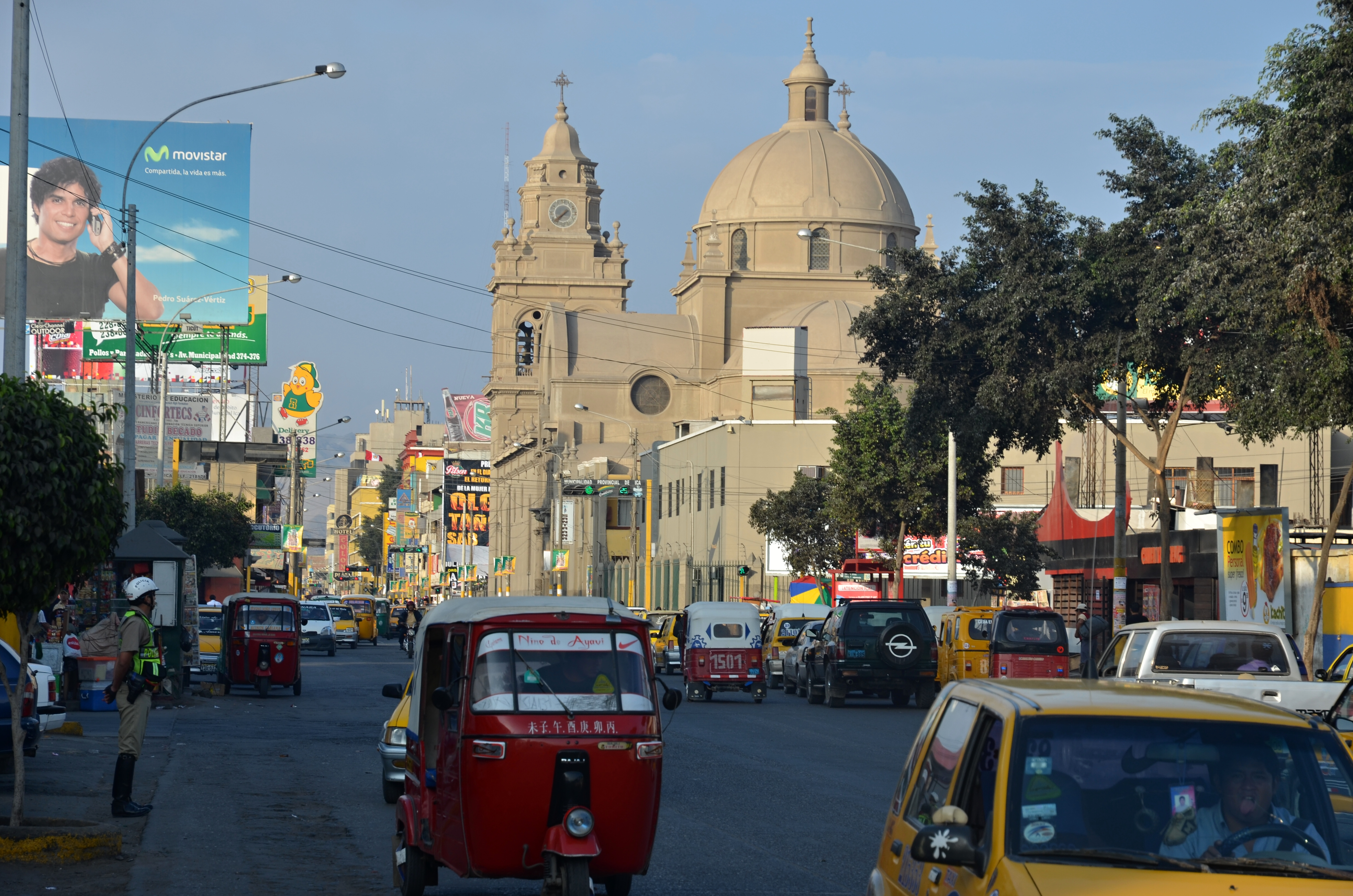
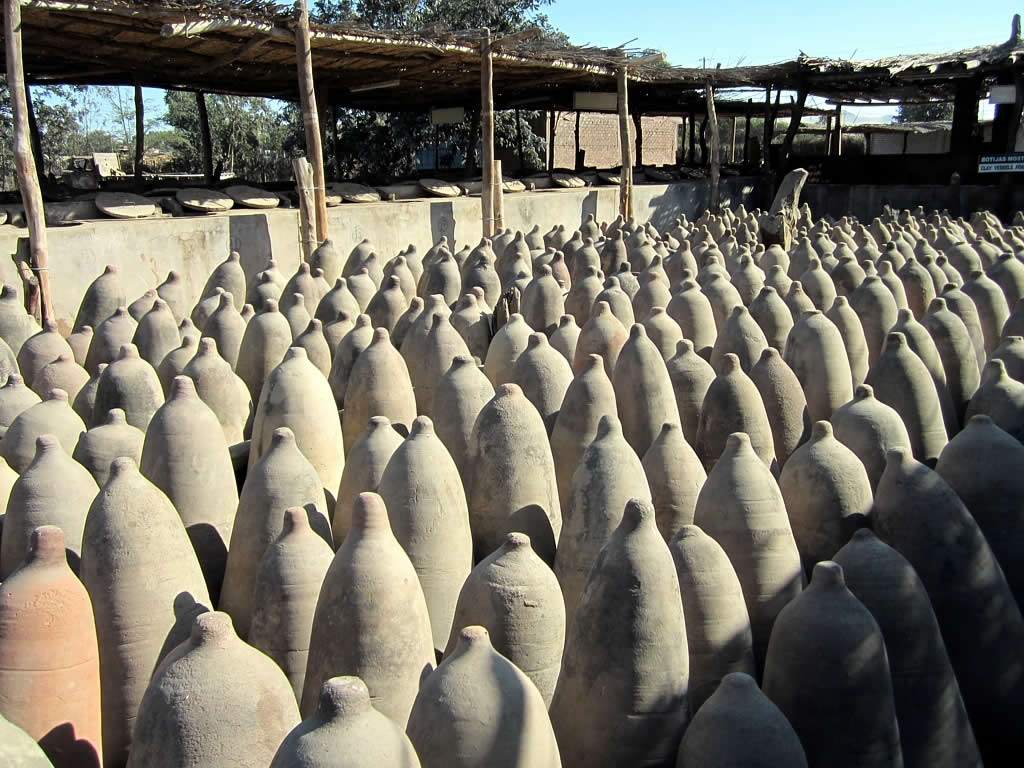
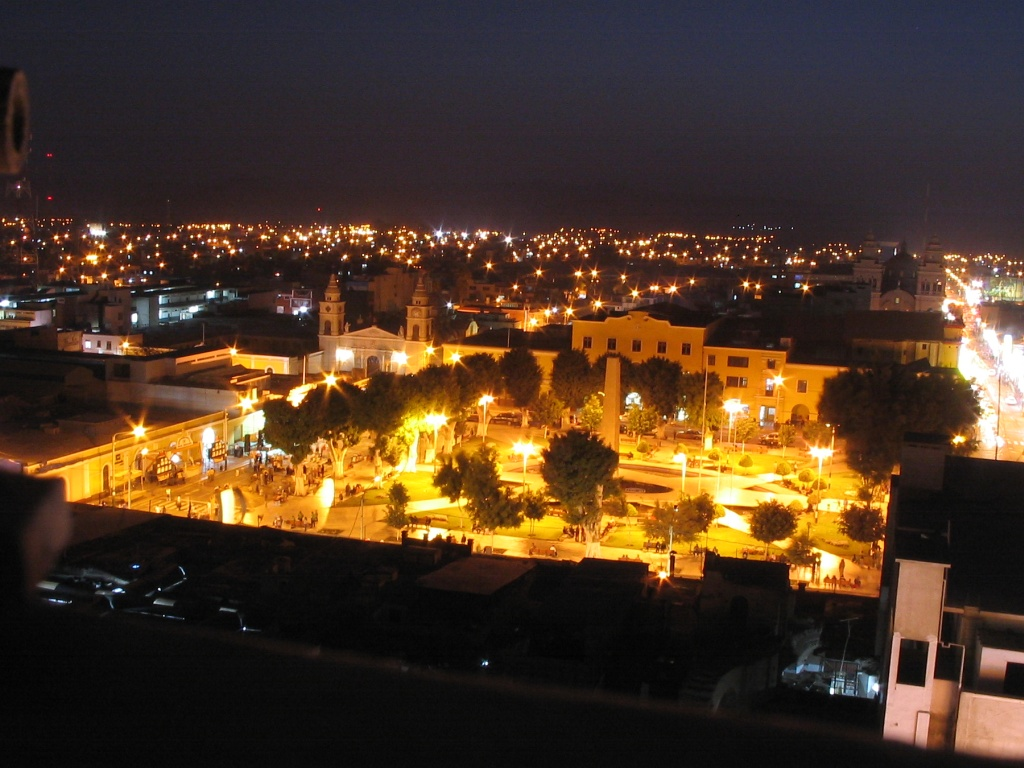
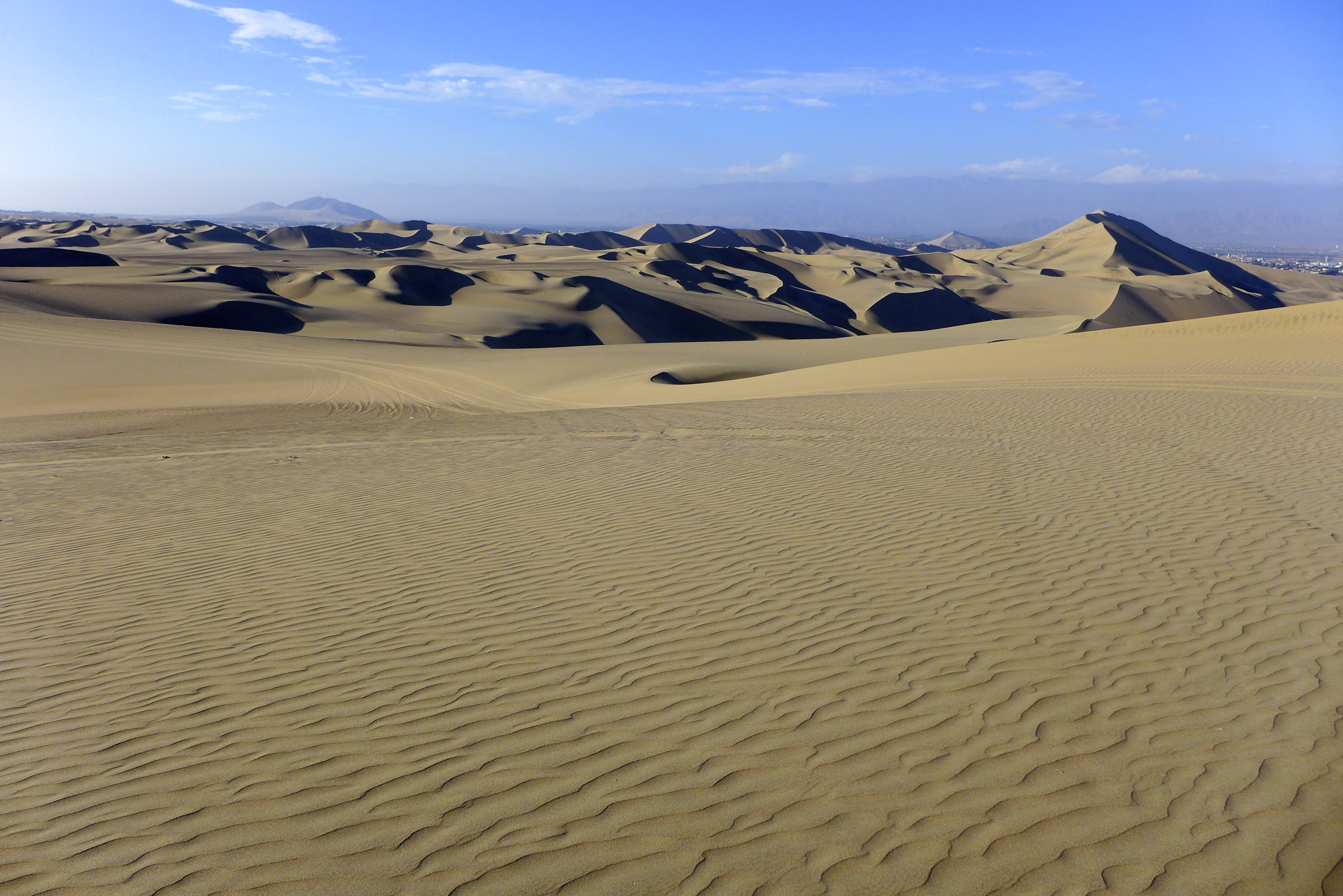
- Huacachina Oasis, Lord of Luren Temple, San Francisco Church, El Catador Winery, Plaza de Armas at night and Huacachina Dunes.

- Flag Coat of arms
- Nickname(s): La Ciudad del Eterno Sol (The City of Eternal Sun); Cuna del Pisco (Cradle of Pisco); Ciudad del Sol (City of the Sun)
- Anthem: Himno a Ica
- Interactive map of Ica
- Location within Peru
- Coordinates: 14°04′S 75°44′W
- Country: Peru
- Region: Ica
- Province: Ica
- Founded: 17 June 1563
- Founder: Jerónimo Luis de Cabrera

Government
  - Type: Democracy
  - Mayor: Emma Luisa Mejía Venegas (2019–2022)

Area
  - City: 7,894 km^{2} (3,048 sq mi)
- Elevation: 406 m (1,332 ft)

Population (2022)
  - City: 325,700
  - Rank: 12th in Peru; 14th (Agglomeration)
  - Density: 41.26/km^{2} (106.9/sq mi)
  - Urban: 213,644
  - Metro: 390,403
- Demonym: Iqueño/a
- Time zone: UTC-5 (PET)
  - Summer (DST): UTC-5 (PET)
- Area code: 56
- Website: www.muniica.gob.pe

Ica (Spanish pronunciation: [ˈika]; Quechua: Ika) is a city and the capital of the Department of Ica in southern Peru. While the area was long inhabited by varying cultures of indigenous peoples, the Spanish conquistador Jerónimo Luis de Cabrera claimed its founding in 1563.

As of the 2017 census, it had a population of over 282,407. The city suffered extensive damage and loss of life during the 2007 Peru earthquake.

== Toponymy ==
Researchers have not conclusively determined the etymological origin of the word Ica, but it is well established that the native inhabitants called this valley Ica, as documented in numerous historical records.

Regarding its etymological origin, Fray Martín de Murúa recounts that Túpac Inca, while passing through this city during the reign of Pachacuti, asked an indigenous shaman to travel to the oracle of Pachacámac and attend the sacrifices performed there. The shaman requested "a sign for the great high priest, lord of the huacas of that place, so that he would know the shaman was traveling by order of the Inca, his king and lord." Túpac Inca replied, "y, ca," meaning "yes, take it." According to Murúa, in remembrance of this event, the city "from that time onward was called and has borne the name Ica."

Linguist Rodolfo Cerrón-Palomino rejects Murúa's explanation on philological grounds, instead proposing a possible Aymara origin. He suggests that Ica may derive from the Colonial Aymara verbal root jikha-, which Ludovico Bertonio recorded with the meaning "to lead a sheep, horse, or other beast ahead." This archaic root is closely related to the modern Aymara words jikhani and jikhaña, meaning "behind," "rear," "back," or "ridge." Cerrón-Palomino proposes that the original form of the root was *ikha-, and that the initial /h/ sound (represented by j in Aymara orthography) was added later under the influence of the aspirated /kʰ/. This hypothesis is supported by the chronicler Agustín de Zárate, who recorded the place name as Hica, with an initial H. Under this interpretation, Ica would mean something like "rear part" or "ridge," while the noun it originally modified may have disappeared; possible examples include marka ("village"), pampa ("plain"), or pata ("terrace").

Another theory concerning the origin of the name was proposed by José Sebastián Barranca in a letter addressed to Juan de Dios López. Referring to the etymology of Ica, Barranca wrote:

"I shall begin by discussing the root ik, meaning river, lagoon, or well. Although it does not exist in spoken Quechua, it does appear in place names, undoubtedly of great antiquity. From this root derives Ica (ika), which can be analyzed as ik + a, meaning river, lagoon, or well."

A further theory comes from Juan Durand in his work Etimologías Perú-Bolivianas. He argues that the word Ica exists in Quechua and means "dry, hard, barren, or rugged lands," accurately describing the terrain on which the city was founded. Durand supports his argument by noting that other arid or water-scarce places bear similar names, including Icampa, Icaño, and Icapil in Argentina; Sicasica in Bolivia; Icata in Tacna; Icaco and Icallo in Puno; Sicahuasi in Apurímac; Sicaya in Huancayo; and Jicán in Piura, among others.

== History ==
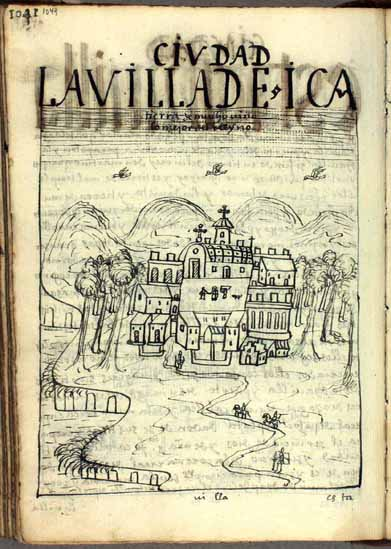
Ica in 1615, by Guamán Poma

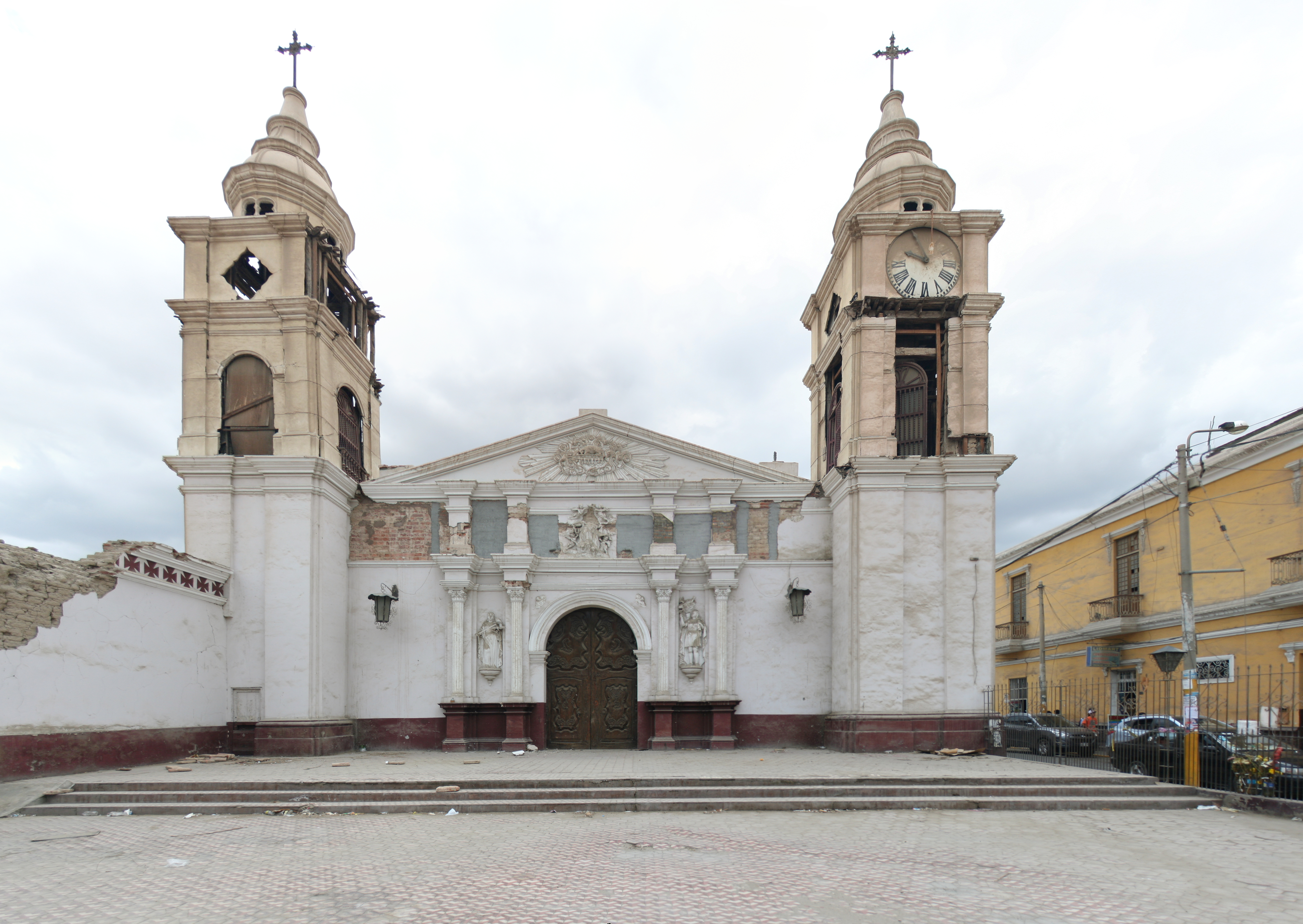
Ica Cathedral with damage from earthquake of 2007

In 2007, researchers found the fossil remains of a prehistoric penguin, Icadyptes salasi, which inhabited the Atacama Desert about 30 million years ago. Scientists estimate it was about 4.5 or 5 feet (137 or 152 cm) tall, with a 1-foot-long (30.5 cm) beak.

Evidence of prehistoric indigenous civilizations has been found in the nearby deserts, such as that of Paracas. Other cultures include the Chincha and the Inca, the latter of whom ruled this area beginning in the 14th century. Numerous pre-Columbian archeological artifacts are now displayed in the Museo Regional de Ica.

The Inca were still in power when the Spanish conquistadors invaded the territory. The Spanish colonial city was founded on 17 June 1563 by Gerónimo Luis de Cabrera as Villa de Valverde. It was ruled by Spain under colonial rulers until Peru achieved independence in 1821.

On 15 August 2007, a magnitude 8.0 earthquake occurred off the coast of Peru, severely damaging buildings, houses and infrastructure in Ica. Initially 17 people died and 70 were killed when a church collapsed. Pisco was even more severely damaged and many people were buried under buildings that had collapsed. Some 80% of the city's buildings were destroyed.

== Geography ==
The city is located on the Ica River about 300 km (190 mi) to the south of Lima, along the desert coast of southern Peru. Further south along the Pan-American Highway lies the city of Nazca.

=== Climate ===
Ica lies on the border of the Atacama desert and has one of the driest climates in the world Köppen BWh, with only around 1 centimetre of rainfall for the whole year. Temperatures are hot during the summer months (December – March) and warm through the winter months (June – September).

Climate data for Ica (San Camilo), elevation 407 m (1,335 ft), (1991–2020)
Month	Jan	Feb	Mar	Apr	May	Jun	Jul	Aug	Sep	Oct	Nov	Dec	Year
Mean daily maximum °C (°F)	31.9 (89.4)	33.0 (91.4)	33.4 (92.1)	31.9 (89.4)	29.2 (84.6)	26.0 (78.8)	25.2 (77.4)	26.1 (79.0)	27.8 (82.0)	29.2 (84.6)	30.0 (86.0)	31.0 (87.8)	29.6 (85.2)
Mean daily minimum °C (°F)	17.8 (64.0)	18.7 (65.7)	17.8 (64.0)	15.5 (59.9)	12.4 (54.3)	10.8 (51.4)	10.3 (50.5)	10.4 (50.7)	10.9 (51.6)	12.1 (53.8)	13.4 (56.1)	15.6 (60.1)	13.8 (56.8)
Average precipitation mm (inches)	5.0 (0.20)	2.2 (0.09)	1.2 (0.05)	0.2 (0.01)	0.1 (0.00)	0.4 (0.02)	0.3 (0.01)	0.2 (0.01)	0.1 (0.00)	0.0 (0.0)	0.2 (0.01)	0.2 (0.01)	10.1 (0.41)
Source: National Meteorology and Hydrology Service of Peru

== Transportation ==
Ica can be reached from Lima by the Pan-American Highway, a journey of 320 kilometres (200 mi).

The Tren de la Costa is planned.

== Tourism ==
Ica and surrounding areas are the traditional source of Pisco brandy. Ica is the site of the Museo Regional de Ica, a regional museum with exhibits ranging from prehistoric artifacts to the Spanish colonial era. On display are pre-Columbian funerary bundles and mummies. The elongated skulls from the Paracas and pre-Inca cultures suggest ritual deformation, perhaps to mark an elite class. Some skulls also bear evidence of trepanning, a kind of early brain surgery to relieve internal pressure or remove damaged skull matter suffered in battle.

A collection of furniture, paintings and artifacts date from the Spanish colonial era.

The Department of Ica encompasses considerable desert, giving it unique opportunities for tourism. The nearby Huacachina oasis is located in the midst of sand dunes. The city of Ica attracts international travelers, as well as resort seekers from Peru. Some young visitors try sandboarding; others travel the dunes in sand buggies.

== Agriculture ==
The many days of sunshine have made Ica the center of an important agricultural region. Commodity crops are cotton, grapes, asparagus, avocado, mango, olives and other produce. It is known by Peruvians as the "Land of Eternal Sun".

Although the area has four seasons, the climate is warm and dry. Visitors say that it feels like a northern summer year-round. The climate of the city can help in easing asthma, which is aggravated by damp and humid climates and their associated allergens.

The desert city has drawn water for domestic and agricultural needs from an aquifer fed by glacial melt water. The regional usage is exceeding the inflow of water into the aquifer. Because the aquifer is quickly drying up, activists have called for more efficient irrigation, or adding dams and water diversions.

== See also ==
- Ica stones
- Irrigation in Peru
- Administrative divisions of Peru
