= Robert Ascher =

American archaeologist and anthropologist (1931–2014)

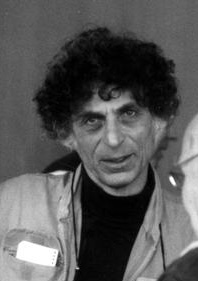
- Robert Ascher in 1987
- Born: April 28, 1931; Far Rockaway, New York City, U.S.
- Died: January 8, 2014 (aged 82)
- Known for: Experimental archaeology, ethnomathematics, quipu studies
- Spouse: Marcia Ascher

Academic background
- Education: Queens College, City University of New York (B.A., 1954); University of California, Los Angeles (M.A., 1959; Ph.D., 1960)
- Thesis: The Nature of the Imitative Experiment in Archaeology (1960)

Academic work
- Discipline: Anthropology, Archaeology

Robert Ascher (April 28, 1931 – January 8, 2014) was an American archaeologist, anthropologist, ethnomathematician, and experimental filmmaker. He is best known for his contributions to experimental archaeology and for his collaborative work on quipu with his wife, Marcia Ascher. He was commonly referred to as "Bob" by friends, colleagues, and family.

== Education ==
He earned his B.A. in anthropology from Queens College, City University of New York in 1954. After a brief period of service in the United States Army, he pursued graduate studies at the University of California, Los Angeles, where he received his M.A. in 1959 and his Ph.D. in 1960. His doctoral dissertation was titled The Nature of the Imitative Experiment in Archaeology.

== Career ==
Soon after receiving his Ph.D., Ascher joined the faculty at Cornell University as part of the anthropology department, where he was promoted to full professor in 1966, and later to emeritus professor in 2002.

In the early 1960s, he played a key role in the development of experimental archaeology as a methodological approach in the field. Starting in the 1970s, he also contributed to the study of quipus, an indigenous Andean record-keeping system, in collaboration with his wife, Marcia Ascher.

== Death ==
Robert Ascher died on January 8, 2014, at the age of 82. He was buried at Lake View Cemetery in Ithaca, New York.

== Selected publications ==
- Ascher, Robert. 1961. “Experimental Archeology.” American Anthropologist 63 (4): 793–816.
- Ascher, Robert. 1961. "Analogy in Archaeological Interpretation." Southwestern Journal of Anthropology 17 (4): 317–325.
