= Marcia Ascher =

American ethnomathematician

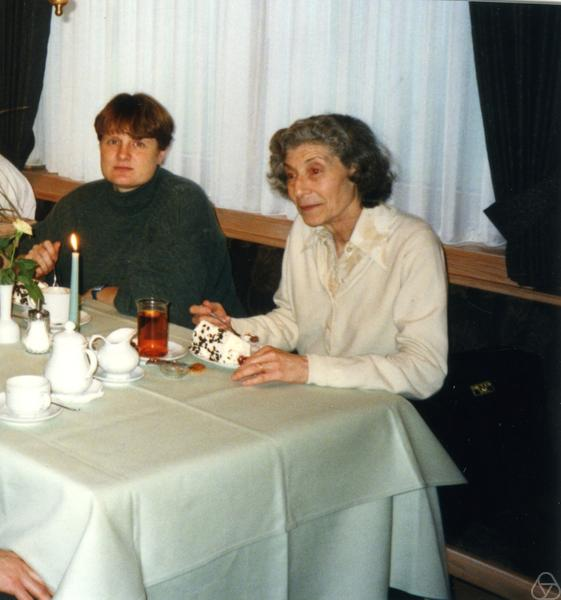

Marcia Alper Ascher (April 23, 1935 – August 10, 2013) was an American mathematician, and a leader and pioneer in ethnomathematics. She was a professor emerita of mathematics at Ithaca College.

== Life ==
Ascher was born in New York City, the daughter of a glazier and a secretary. She graduated from Queens College, City University of New York in 1956, and married Robert Ascher, an anthropologist graduating from Queens College in the same year.

They both became graduate students at the University of California, Los Angeles; she completed a master's degree in 1960, and moved with her husband to Ithaca, New York, where he had found a faculty position at Cornell University.

She joined the mathematics department at Ithaca College in 1960, as one of the founders of the department. She retired as full professor emerita in 1995.

She died on August 10, 2013.

== Books ==
With her husband, Ascher co-authored the book Code of the Quipu: A Study in Media, Mathematics, and Culture (University of Michigan Press, 1981); it was republished in 1997 by Dover Books as Mathematics of the Incas: Code of the Quipu. She was also the sole author of two more books on ethnomathematics, Ethnomathematics: A Multicultural View of Mathematical Ideas (Brooks/Cole, 1991) and Mathematics Elsewhere: An Exploration of Ideas across Cultures (Princeton University Press, 2002). The Basic Library List Committee of the Mathematical Association of America has recommended the inclusion of all three books in undergraduate mathematics libraries. Mathematics Elsewhere won an honorable mention in the 2002 PROSE Awards in the mathematics and statistics category.
